= Karnail Ganj =

- Village
- Location in Punjab, India Karnail Ganj (India)
- Coordinates: 31.371480°N 75.393681°E
- Country: India
- State: Punjab
- District: Kapurthala

Government
  - Type: Panchayati raj (India)
  - Body: Gram panchayat

Population (2011)
  - Total: 795
- Sex ratio 410/385♂/♀

Languages
  - Official: Punjabi
  - Other spoken: Hindi
- Time zone: UTC+5:30 (IST)
- PIN: 144636
- Telephone code: 01822
- ISO 3166 code: IN-PB
- Vehicle registration: PB-09
- Website: kapurthala.gov.in

Karnail Ganj is a village in Bhulath Tehsil in Kapurthala district of Punjab State, India. It is located 6 kilometres (3.7 mi) from Bhulath, 30 kilometres (19 mi) away from district headquarter Kapurthala. The village is administrated by a Sarpanch, who is an elected representative.

== Demography ==
According to the report published by Census India in 2011, Karnail Ganj has 171 houses with the total population of 795 persons of which 410 are male and 385 females. Literacy rate of Karnail Ganj is 77.98%, higher than the state average of 75.84%. The population of children in the age group 0–6 years is 91 which is 11.45% of the total population. Child sex ratio is approximately 685, lower than the state average of 846.

== Population data ==
Particulars	Total	Male	Female
Total No. of Houses	171	-	-
Population	795	410	385
Child (0-6)	91	54	37
Schedule Caste	0	0	0
Schedule Tribe	0	0	0
Literacy	77.98 %	81.46 %	74.43 %
Total Workers	259	243	16
Main Worker	249	0	0
Marginal Worker	10	10	0

As per census 2011, 259 people were engaged in work activities out of the total population of Karnail Ganj which includes 243 males and 16 females. According to census survey report 2011, 96.14% workers (employment or earning more than six months) describe their work as main work and 3.86% workers are involved in marginal activity providing livelihood for less than 6 months.

== Caste ==
The village doesn't have any schedule caste (SC) and schedule tribe (ST) population. Saini, jatt, lubana, kamboj are natives of karnail ganj.

== Transport ==
There are no railway stations near to Karnail Ganj in less than 10 km. Jalandhar City Railway station is 35 km away from the village. The village is 77 km away from Sri Guru Ram Dass Jee International Airport in Amritsar. Another nearby airport is Pathankot Airport in Pathankot which is located 76 km away from the village. Kartarpur, Urmar Tanda, Dasua, Qadian are nearby cities to Karnail Ganj village.

== Nearby cities ==
- Bhulath
- Kapurthala
- Phagwara
- Sultanpur Lodhi

== Nearby villages ==
- Akala,
- Bagrian
- Bajaj
- Bhatnura Kalan
- Bhatnura Khurd
- Boparai
- Fatehpur
- Jhall Bajaj
- Lamman
- Nadali
- Tandi
