= Akala, Bhulath =

Akala
- Village
- Location in Punjab, India Akala (India)
- Coordinates: 31.565982°N 75.519274°E
- Country: India
- State: Punjab
- District: Kapurthala

Government
  - Type: Panchayati raj (India)
  - Body: Gram panchayat

Population (2011)
  - Total: 1,144
- Sex ratio 541/603♂/♀

Languages
  - Official: Punjabi
  - Other spoken: Hindi
- Time zone: UTC+5:30 (IST)
- PIN: 144622
- Telephone code: 01822
- ISO 3166 code: IN-PB
- Vehicle registration: PB-09
- Website: kapurthala.gov.in

Akala is a village in Bhulath Tehsil in Kapurthala district of Punjab State, India. It is located 4 kilometres (2.5 mi) from Bhulath, 30 kilometres (19 mi) away from district headquarter Kapurthala. The village is administrated by a Sarpanch who is an elected representative of village as per the constitution of India and Panchayati raj (India).

== Transport ==
There are no railway stations near to Akala in less than 10 km; however, Jalandhar City Railway station is 29 km away from the village. The village is 76 km away from Sri Guru Ram Dass Jee International Airport in Amritsar and the next nearest airport is Pathankot Airport in Pathankot, which is located 82 km away from the village. Kartarpur, Urmar Tanda, Kapurthala, Jalandhar are the nearby cities to Akala village.

== Nearby villages ==
- Bagrian
- Bajaj
- Bhagwanpur
- Boparai
- Fatehpur
- Jhall Bajaj
- Karnail Ganj
- Metlan Khairabad
- Pandori
- Sher Singhwala
- Surak

== List of cities near the village ==
- Bhulath
- Kapurthala
- Phagwara
- Sultanpur Lodhi

== Air travel connectivity ==
The closest International airport to the village is Sri Guru Ram Dass Jee International Airport.
