= List of ship decommissionings in 1919 =

The list of ship decommissionings in 1919 iis a chronological list of ships decommissioned in 1919. In cases where no official commissioning ceremony was held, the date of service entry may be used instead. For ships lost at sea, see list of shipwrecks in 1919 instead.

Date	Operator	Ship	Pennant	Class and type	Fate and other notes
January 2	United States Navy	Anton Dohrn	SP-1086	Section patrol craft	Returned to pre–World War I owner
January 17	United States Navy	Akbar	SP-599	Section patrol craft	Sold
January 21	Imperial German Navy	Glyndwr		Converted merchant-type auxiliary hulk	Surrendered to the United Kingdom; became SS Akenside
January 29	United States Navy	Aloha	SP-317	Section patrol craft	Returned to pre–World War I owner and scrapped in 1938
January	United States Navy	Arvilla	SP-752	Section patrol craft	Returned to pre–World War I civilian owner
February 27	United States Navy	Arval	SP-1045	Section patrol craft	Returned to pre–World War I civilian owner
March 12	United States Navy	Amagansett	SP-693	Section patrol craft/minesweeper	Returned to pre–World War I owner
March 27	United States Navy	Audwin	SP-451	Section patrol craft	transferred to United States Coast and Geodetic Survey until sold in 1927
March 28	United States Navy	Almax II	SP-268	Section patrol craft	Transferred to United States Coast and Geodetic Survey until returned to United States Navy and sold 1920
March 31	United States Navy	Iowa	BB-4	Battleship	Used as a target ship
April 28	United States Navy	Alacrity	SP-206	Section patrol craft	Returned to pre–World War I owner until returned to service as USCGC Blanchard 1942–1943
May 5	United States Navy	Artemis	SP-593	Section patrol craft	Sold 1920; Burned and sank 1927
May 7	United States Navy	Arcturus	SP-182	Section patrol craft	Sold
May 7	United States Navy	Atlantis	SP-40	Section patrol craft	Sold
May 12	United States Navy	Arcady	SP-577	Section patrol craft	Sold
May 17	United States Navy	SP-729	SP-729	Section patrol craft	Transferred to United States Coast Guard
July 2	United States Navy	Aphrodite	SP-135	Section patrol craft	Returned to pre–World War I owner
July 8	United States Navy	Actus	SP-516	Section patrol craft	Returned to pre–World War I civilian owner
August 2	United States Navy	Althea	SP-218	Section patrol craft	Sank 1920
August 12	United States Navy	Aurore II	SP-460	Section patrol craft	Sold
August 18	United States Navy	Adelante	SP-765	Section patrol craft	Sold
September 1	Regia Marina	F3	F3	F-class submarine	Scrapped
September 1	Regia Marina	F4	F4	F-class submarine	Scrapped
September 1	Regia Marina	F8	F8	F-class submarine	Scrapped
September 1	Regia Marina	F11	F11	F-class submarine	Scrapped
September 8	United States Navy	Anderton	SP-530	Section patrol craft/minesweeper	Returned to pre–World War I owner
September	United States Navy	Ameera	SP-453	Section patrol craft	Sold
November 5	Imperial German Navy	Stuttgart		Königsberg-class light cruiser	Stricken and surrendered to the United Kingdom as Prize S in 1920
December 12	United States Navy	A-2	Submarine Torpedo Boat No. 3	Plunger-class submarine	ex-Adder; used as a target from 1920 and stricken in 1922
December 12	United States Navy	A-4	Submarine Torpedo Boat No. 5	Plunger-class submarine	ex-Moccasin; used as a target ship and stricken in 1922
December 12	United States Navy	A-6	Submarine Torpedo Boat No. 7	Plunger-class submarine	ex-Porpoise; used as a target ship and stricken in 1922
December 12	United States Navy	A-7	Submarine Torpedo Boat No. 8	Plunger-class submarine	ex-Shark; used as a target ship in 1921 and stricken in 1922
December 18	Imperial German Navy	Oswald	FS3	Converted merchant type seaplane carrier	Surrendered to the United Kingdom; became SS Eian Maru
unknown date	United States Navy	Akela	SP-1793	Section patrol craft	Returned to pre–World War I owner until scrapped 1935
unknown date	United States Navy	Albacore	SP-751	Section patrol craft	Returned to pre–World War I owner
unknown date	United States Navy	Albatross	SP-1003	Section patrol craft	Returned to pre–World War I owner
unknown date	United States Navy	Alpha	SP-586	Section patrol craft	Sold
unknown date	United States Navy	Anado	SP-4555	Section patrol craft	Returned to pre–World War I owner
unknown date	Imperial German Navy	Answald	FS1	Converted merchant type seaplane carrier	Surrendered to the United Kingdom; became SS Vulcan City
unknown date	Imperial German Navy	Santa Elena	FS2	Converted merchant type seaplane carrier	Surrendered to the United States; became SS Santa Elena
