= Alkali Lake =

Alkali Lake may refer to:

A soda lake or "alkaline lake" (a lake with high alkalinity)

== In Canada ==
- Alkali Lake, British Columbia
- Alkali Lake Indian Band, First Nations government of the Secwepemc (Shuswap) people in British Columbia

== In the United States ==
- Alkali Lakes, playas in northeastern California
- Alkali Lake Chemical Waste Dump, hazardous waste disposal site in Oregon
- Alkali Lake, a playa in Oregon
- Alkali Lake State Airport, airport in Oregon
- Alkali Lake in Blaine County, Montana
- Alkali Lake in Lincoln County, Montana
- Alkali Lake in Glacier County, Montana
- Alkali Lake in Meagher County, Montana
- Alkali Lake in Pondera County, Montana
- Alkali Lake in Toole County, Montana
- Alkali Lake (Lander and Pershing counties, Nevada), a lake in Nevada

== In fiction ==
- Alkali Lake, a fictional location in the X-Men universe, portrayed in films using the real-life Barrier Lake
