= Alkali (disambiguation) =

Alkali is a specific type of chemical base.

Alkali may refer to:

== Places ==
- Alkali, Nevada, United States, a ghost town
- Alkali Lake (disambiguation)
- An island in Lake Abaya, Ethiopia

== People ==
- Ibrahim Alkali (born 1940), Nigerian air commodore and military governor of Kwara State from 1987 to 1989
- Mohammed Alkali (born 1950), Nigerian politician
- Zaynab Alkali (born 1950), Nigerian novelist, poet and short story writer

== Other uses ==
- "Alkali", the NATO reporting name of the Kaliningrad K-5 air-to-air missile

== See also ==
- Akali (disambiguation)
- Alkali Falls, Oregon
- Alkali Ridge, Utah, a set of archaeological remains of the earliest forms of Puebloan architecture
- The Rub' al Khali, also known as the Great Sandy Desert
- Judah Alkalai (1798–1878), Sephardic Jewish rabbi
- Alkali metals
- Alçalı (disambiguation)
- Alkaline (disambiguation)
