= White evening primrose =

White evening primrose or white evening-primrose may refer to the following plant species:

- Oenothera cespitosa
- Oenothera tetraptera
