= Desert evening primrose =

Desert evening primrose or desert evening-primrose may refer to the following plant species:

- Oenothera cespitosa
- Oenothera primiveris
