= Anado =

Anado may refer to:

- Anado McLauchlin (b. 1947), an artist living in Mexico
- USS Anado (SP-455), a US Navy patrol vessel in commission from 1917 to 1919
