= Fragrant evening primrose =

Fragrant evening primrose or fragrant evening-primrose may refer to the following plant species:

- Oenothera cespitosa
- Oenothera odorata
- Oenothera stricta
