= Akala =

Akala may refer to:

- ʻĀkala or "Hawaiian raspberry" (Rubus hawaiensis), a species of flowering plant endemic to Hawaii
- Akala (rapper), British rap and hip hop artist
- Akala, Bhulath, a village in Bhulath Tehsil in Kapurthala district of Punjab State, India

== See also ==
- Akela (disambiguation)
- Acala (disambiguation)
- Akali (disambiguation)
