= Alkali Lake (Oregon) =

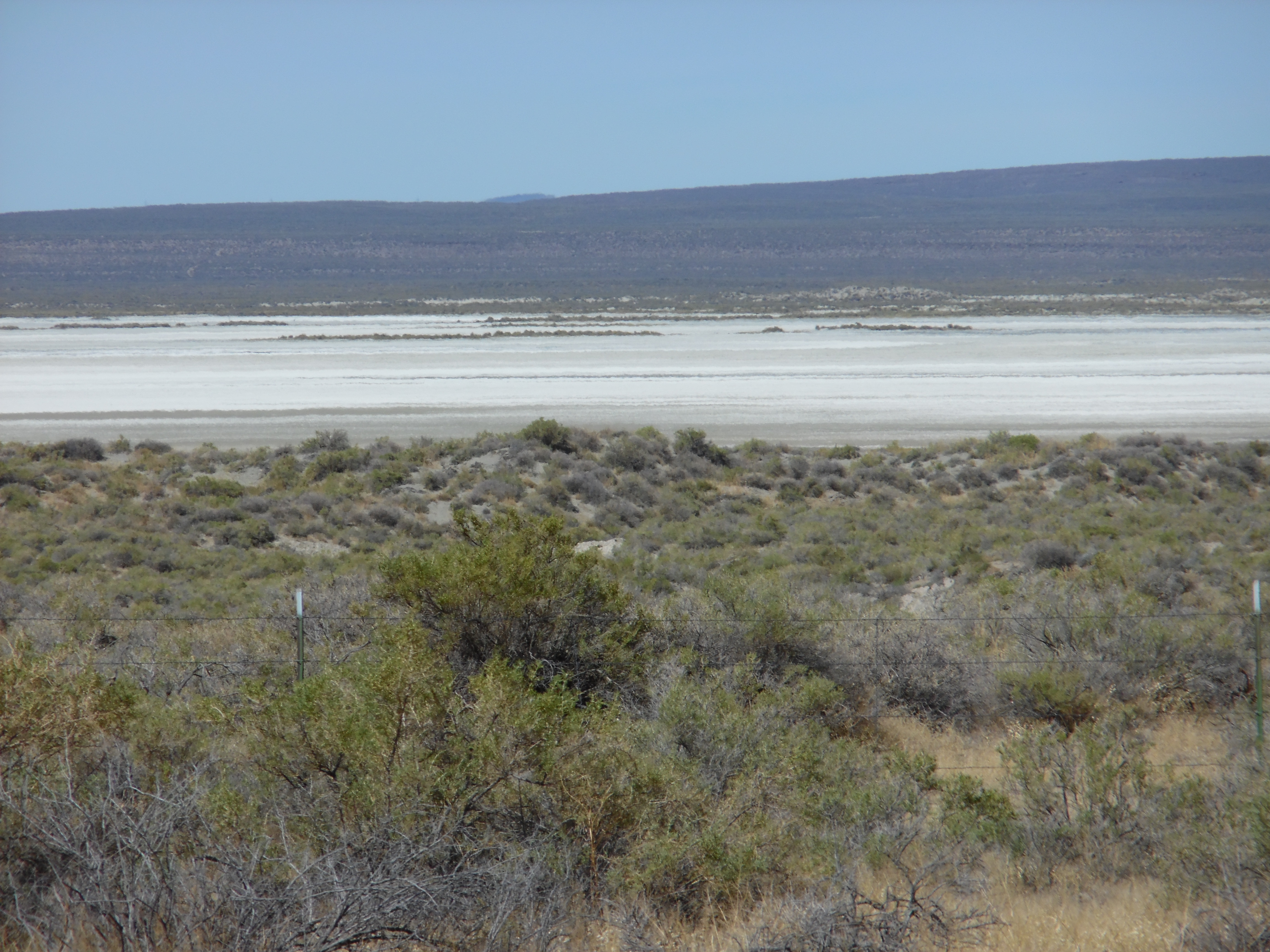
- Alkali Lake dry lakebed and surrounding desert

- Location within Oregon
- Location: Lake County, Oregon
- Coordinates: 42°58′38″N 120°01′41″W
- Lake type: seasonal, alkali
- Basin countries: United States
- Surface elevation: 4,332 ft (1,320 m)

Alkali Lake is a geographic sink located in Lake County, Oregon, United States. It lies within the Alkali Subbasin of the Summer Lake Basin watershed in southeastern Oregon. The lake is situated 26 miles east of Christmas Valley, Oregon, northeast of Lake Abert, and directly west of Abert Rim and Highway 395.

Alkali Lake is believed to have reached a prehistoric maximum depth of 270.7 feet (82.5 meters) and covered about 1,448.4 square miles (3,751 square kilometers). Since then, its water level has fluctuated, with a general trend towards drying. Notable features include dissolved alkaline salts averaging 10% of total brine weight in its seasonal waters and a nearby chemical disaster, Alkali Lake Chemical Waste Dump.

== Plants ==
Plants known to occur in the dunes immediately north of the lake include:

- Buckwheat Family
  - Broom Buckwheat
- Goosefoot Family
  - Spiny Hopsage
- Mustard Family
  - Stanleya or Guillenia sp.
- Evening-primrose family
  - Desert Evening-primrose
- Parsley Family
  - Rhysopterus plurijugus
- Phlox Family
  - Dainty gilia
- Borage Family
  - Matted Cryptantha
- Sunflower Family
  - Desert Pincushion
  - Gray Rabbitbrush
  - Showy Townsend Daisy

== Climate ==
According to the Köppen Climate Classification system, Alkali Lake has a steppe climate, abbreviated "BSk" on climate maps.

Climate data for Alkali Lake (1991–2020 normals, extremes 1961–present)
Month	Jan	Feb	Mar	Apr	May	Jun	Jul	Aug	Sep	Oct	Nov	Dec	Year
Record high °F (°C)	66 (19)	72 (22)	78 (26)	88 (31)	97 (36)	100 (38)	108 (42)	105 (41)	101 (38)	90 (32)	75 (24)	69 (21)	108 (42)
Mean daily maximum °F (°C)	42.9 (6.1)	45.4 (7.4)	51.6 (10.9)	58.3 (14.6)	66.8 (19.3)	75.8 (24.3)	88.1 (31.2)	86.8 (30.4)	77.1 (25.1)	63.3 (17.4)	49.7 (9.8)	41.3 (5.2)	62.3 (16.8)
Daily mean °F (°C)	31.5 (−0.3)	33.1 (0.6)	38.2 (3.4)	42.8 (6.0)	51.4 (10.8)	58.3 (14.6)	67.8 (19.9)	66.8 (19.3)	57.7 (14.3)	46.1 (7.8)	36.2 (2.3)	30.1 (−1.1)	46.7 (8.2)
Mean daily minimum °F (°C)	20.0 (−6.7)	20.9 (−6.2)	24.8 (−4.0)	27.4 (−2.6)	36.1 (2.3)	40.9 (4.9)	47.5 (8.6)	46.8 (8.2)	38.3 (3.5)	28.5 (−1.9)	22.6 (−5.2)	19.0 (−7.2)	31.1 (−0.5)
Record low °F (°C)	−38 (−39)	−26 (−32)	−11 (−24)	6 (−14)	4 (−16)	23 (−5)	30 (−1)	28 (−2)	14 (−10)	−2 (−19)	−22 (−30)	−33 (−36)	−38 (−39)
Average precipitation inches (mm)	1.25 (32)	1.00 (25)	1.06 (27)	1.13 (29)	1.57 (40)	0.97 (25)	0.41 (10)	0.35 (8.9)	0.50 (13)	0.93 (24)	0.85 (22)	1.27 (32)	11.29 (287)
Source: NOAA

== See also ==
- Alkali Lake State Airport

== Works cited ==
- McArthur, Lewis A. Oregon Geographic Names, Fourth ed. 1974. Edwards Brothers. Ann Arbor, MI
- U.S. Fish and Wildlife Service, Oregon Field Office
