= Akela =

Akela may refer to:

- Akela (The Jungle Book), the wolf featured in Rudyard Kipling's Mowgli stories collected in The Jungle Book and The Second Jungle Book
- Akela (Scouting), a symbol of wisdom in the Cub Scout program, usually (but not necessarily) Cubmaster or Den Leader; intentionally named after The Jungle Book character
- Akela (spider), spider genus
- Akela (film), a 1941 Indian film
- Akayla, a 1991 Indian film
- Akella, a Russian software development company
- Akeelah and the Bee, a 2006 family film
- USS Akela (SP-1793), formerly steam yacht Akela, built in 1899

== See also ==
- Akeli (disambiguation)
- Akala (disambiguation)
