= Akali =

Akali may refer to:

== Sikhism ==
In the context of Sikhism, "Akali" ("pertaining to Akal or the Supreme Power", "divine") may refer to:

- any member of the Khalsa, i.e. the collective body of baptized Sikhs
- a member of the Akali movement (1919–1925)
- a politician of the Akali Dal political parties
- a term for the Nihang, a Sikh order

== Other uses ==
- Akali (League of Legends), the Rogue Assassin, a playable character in the video game League of Legends and its associated virtual band K/DA

== See also ==
- Akala (disambiguation)
- Akari (disambiguation)
- Alkali (disambiguation)
