= Sand lily =

Sand lily is a common name for several flowering plants and may refer to:

- Eremocrinum albomarginatum, in the asparagus family, Asparagaceae, native to Arizona and Utah
- Leucocrinum montanum, in the asparagus family, Asparagaceae, native to the western United States
- Mentzelia decapetala, in the stickleaf family, Loasaceae, native to the western United States and Canada
- Mentzelia nuda, in the stickleaf family, Loasaceae, native to the central United States
- Oenothera cespitosa, in the evening primrose family, Onagraceae, native to western North America
- Pancratium maritimum, in the amaryllis family, Amaryllidaceae, native to Europe and western Asia
