= Alkali Falls =

- Interactive map of Alkali Falls
- Location: Rogue-Umpqua Divide Wilderness
- Coordinates: 43.0642314°N 122.3641085°W
- Type: Staircase
- Elevation: 5,200 ft (1,600 m)
- Total height: 560 ft (170 m)
- Number of drops: 6
- Average flow rate: 15 cu ft/s (0.42 m^{3}/s)

Alkali Falls, is a multi-step waterfall of 6 tiers located in the east side of the Rogue–Umpqua Divide Wilderness, just west of Mount Bailey and Diamond Lake, on Oregon Route 230 in Douglas County, in the U.S. state of Oregon. It totals 510 feet (160 m) fall in six drops, the Upper Alkali and tallest drop is 130 feet (40 m), making it one of the tallest cascades in Oregon.

The waters of Alkali Falls are located in the heart of Alkali Meadows. The waterfall is upstream of Alkali Creek, a narrow width creek that drains into Muir Creek, which in turn is a tributary of the Rogue River just south of Alkali Creek. The Alkali Falls trailhead is USFS No 1055 that spins off Forest Road 6540-900 from Oregon Route 230.

== See also ==
- List of waterfalls
- List of waterfalls in Oregon
