= Akeli =

Akeli may refer to:

- Akeli (film), a 2014 Indian Hindi-language film by Vinod Pande, starring R. Madhavan; completed in 1999 though released in 2014
- Akelli or Akeli, a 2023 Indian Hindi-language thriller drama film by Pranay Meshram, starring Nushrratt Bharuccha
- Akeli (TV series), a Pakistani drama series

As a surname

- Serafina Akeli, a Samoan javelin thrower

== See also ==
- Akela (disambiguation)
