= Alkaline (disambiguation) =

Alkaline is an adjective referring to alkali, a specific type of chemical base.

Alkaline may also refer to:

- Alkaline battery, a power cell
- Alkaline (musician) (born 1993), Jamaican dancehall musician
- Al Kaline (1934–2020), American baseball player

== See also ==
- Alkaline earth metals
- Alkali (disambiguation)
