= Surak, Bhulath =

Surak
- Village
- Location in Punjab, India Surak (India)
- Coordinates: 31.509904°N 75.496834°E
- Country: India
- State: Punjab
- District: Kapurthala

Government
  - Type: Panchayati raj (India)
  - Body: Gram panchayat

Population (2011)
  - Total: 549
- Sex ratio 280/269♂/♀

Languages
  - Official: Punjabi
  - Other spoken: Hindi
- Time zone: UTC+5:30 (IST)
- PIN: 144401
- Telephone code: 01822
- ISO 3166 code: IN-PB
- Vehicle registration: PB-09
- Website: kapurthala.gov.in

Surak is a village in Bhulath Tehsil in Kapurthala district of Punjab State, India. It is located 5 kilometres (3.1 mi) from Bhulath, 21 kilometres (13 mi) away from district headquarter Kapurthala. The village is administrated by a Sarpanch, who is an elected representative.

== Demography ==
According to the report published by Census India in 2011, Surak has 123 houses with the total population of 549 persons of which 280 are male and 269 females. Literacy rate of Surak is 78.40%, higher than the state average of 75.84%. The population of children in the age group 0–6 years is 63 which is 11.48% of the total population. Child sex ratio is approximately 853, higher than the state average of 846.

== Population data ==
Particulars	Total	Male	Female
Total No. of Houses	123	-	-
Population	549	280	269
Child (0-6)	63	34	29
Schedule Caste	143	80	63
Schedule Tribe	0	0	0
Literacy	78.40 %	83.74 %	72.92 %
Total Workers	132	123	9
Main Worker	131	0	0
Marginal Worker	1	0	1

As per census 2011, 132 people were engaged in work activities out of the total population of Surak which includes 123 males and 9 females. According to census survey report 2011, 99.24% workers (Employment or Earning more than 6 Months) describe their work as main work and 0.76% workers are involved in Marginal activity providing livelihood for less than 6 months.

== Caste ==
The village has schedule caste (SC) constitutes 26.05% of total population of the village and it doesn't have any Schedule Tribe (ST) population.

== List of cities near the village ==
- Bhulath
- Kapurthala
- Phagwara
- Sultanpur Lodhi

== Air travel connectivity ==
The closest International airport to the village is Sri Guru Ram Dass Jee International Airport.
