= Bhagwanpur, Bhulath =

Bhagwanpur
- Village
- Location in Punjab, India Bhagwanpur (India)
- Coordinates: 31.535369°N 75.509868°E
- Country: India
- State: Punjab
- District: Kapurthala

Government
  - Type: Panchayati raj (India)
  - Body: Gram panchayat

Population (2019)
  - Total: 750
- Sex ratio 287/321♂/♀

Languages
  - Official: Punjabi
  - Other spoken: English
- Time zone: UTC+5:30 (IST)
- PIN: 144622
- Telephone code: 01822
- ISO 3166 code: IN-PB
- Vehicle registration: PB-09
- Website: kapurthala.gov.in

Bhagwanpur is a village in Bhulath tehsil, Kapurthala district, Punjab state, India. It is located 2 kilometres (1.2 mi) from[Bhulath and 28 kilometres (17 mi) from the district headquarters at Kapurthala. The village is administrated by a Sarpanch who is an elected representative of village.

== List of cities near the village ==
- Bhulath
- Kapurthala
- Phagwara
- Sultanpur Lodhi

== Air travel connectivity ==
The closest International airport to the village is Sri Guru Ram Dass Jee International Airport.
