= USS Arcturus (SP-182) =

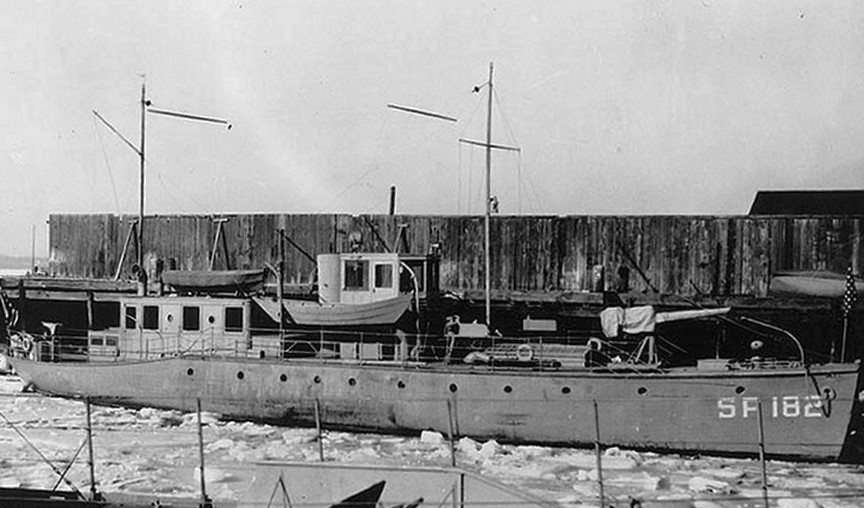
- USS Arcturus (SP-182) in an icy port, circa 1917–1919.

History

United States
- Name: USS Arcturus
- Namesake: The principal star of the northern constellation Boötes with a magnitude of .2 and located 36 light-years' distance from the Earth.
- Builder: Gas Engine and Power Co. and the Charles L. Seabury Co., Morris Heights, New York
- Laid down: date unknown
- Completed: 1911
- Acquired: by the Navy 25 May 1917
- Commissioned: 18 August 1917 as Arcturus (SP-182)
- Decommissioned: 7 May 1919
- Renamed: USS SP-182 in 1918
- Stricken: circa 1919
- Home port: 3rd Naval District, at New York City
- Fate: Sold 4 October 1919

General characteristics
- Class & type: Yacht
- Tonnage: 78 tons
- Length: 90 ft (27 m)
- Beam: 16 ft 6 in (5.03 m)
- Draft: 4 ft 9 in (1.45 m)
- Speed: 14 knots
- Complement: 16 officers and enlisted
- Armament: One 3-pounder gun; Two machine guns

USS Arcturus (SP-182) was a yacht acquired by the U.S. Navy during World War I. She was reconfigured by the Navy as an armed patrol craft, and was assigned to patrol the waterways of New York City.

== Yacht built in New York ==
Arcturus (SP-182)—a wooden-hulled yacht built in 1911 by the Gas Engine & Power Co. and the Charles L. Seabury Co., Morris Heights, New York City—was purchased by the Navy from Martin L. Quinn of New York City on 25 May 1917; and placed in commission on 18 August 1917.

== World War I service ==
For her whole career, Arcturus was assigned to the section patrol duty in the 3d Naval District, headquartered at New York City.

== Post-war decommissioning ==
She was decommissioned on 7 May 1919 and sold on 4 October 1919 to Reinhard Hall, Brooklyn, New York.
