= Rogue–Umpqua Divide Wilderness =

Wilderness in the US

- IUCN category Ib (wilderness area)
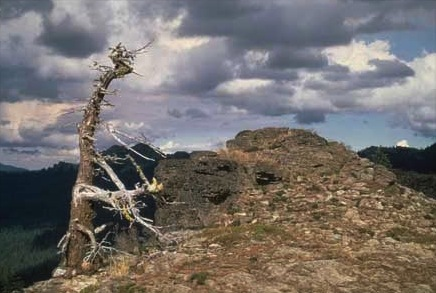
- Interactive map of Rogue–Umpqua Divide Wilderness
- Location: Douglas County, Oregon, United States
- Nearest city: Eagle Point, Oregon
- Coordinates: 43°03′59″N 122°27′46″W
- Area: 33,200 acres (13,400 ha)
- Established: 1984
- Governing body: United States Forest Service

The Rogue–Umpqua Divide Wilderness is a wilderness area located in the Rogue River – Siskiyou and Umpqua National Forests in the Klamath Mountains of Oregon, United States. It was established by the United States Congress in 1984 and comprises 33,200 acres (13,400 ha).

== Topography ==
The Rogue–Umpqua Divide Wilderness is 10 miles (16 km) west of Crater Lake National Park along the dividing ridge between the Rogue and Umpqua Rivers. Elevations range from 3,000 to 6,783 feet (914 to 2,070 m) at the summit of Fish Mountain. Volcanic activity created many unique volcanic and sedimentary rock outcrops.

== Vegetation ==
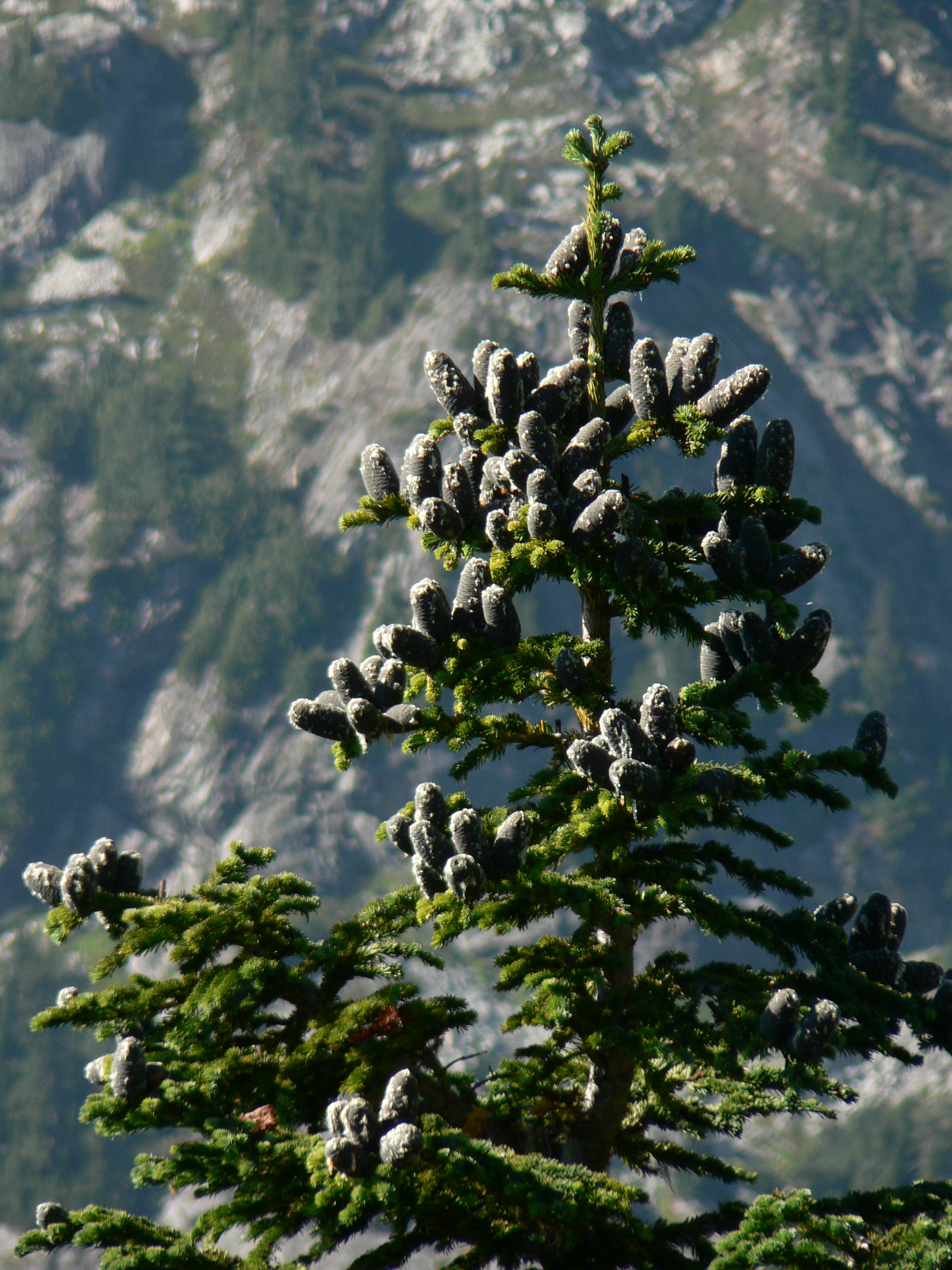
Subalpine fir (Abies lasiocarpa)

Most of the Rogue–Umpqua Divide is covered in a dense forest composed of sugar pine, grand fir, mountain hemlock, western white pine, incense cedar, subalpine fir, western redcedar, white fir, ponderosa pine, Douglas-fir, Alaska cedar, shasta red fir, lodgepole pine, pacific silver fir, western hemlock, and whitebark pine.

The Acker Divide and Cripple Camp trails lead through large stands of old-growth forests.

== Recreation ==
Popular recreational activities in the Wilderness include hiking, camping, and wildlife watching. Approximately 100 miles (160 km) of trails criss-cross the wilderness. The most popular is the 31.4-mile (50.5 km) Rogue–Umpqua Divide National Recreation Trail, which offers exceptional views to the east and west as it weaves across the crest of the divide.

== See also ==
- List of Oregon Wildernesses
- List of U.S. Wilderness Areas
- Wilderness Act
