= USS Amagansett =

Patrol vessel of the United States Navy

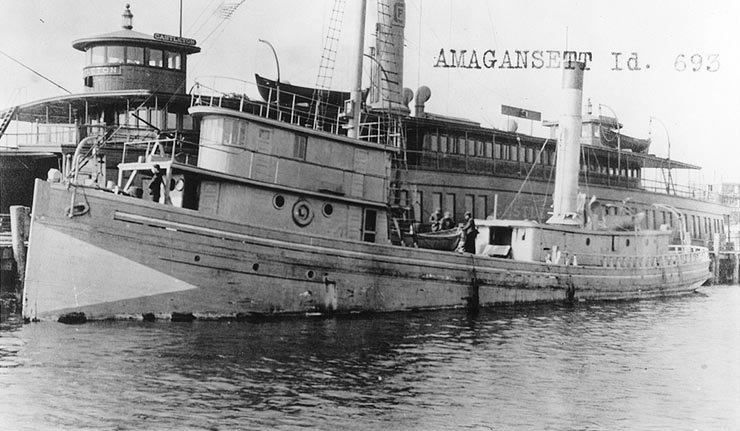
- Amagansett as a commercial fishing trawler, probably around the time the United States Navy acquired her for service as the patrol vessel and minesweeper USS Amagansett (SP-693) in May 1917. The ferry Castleton is in the background.

History

United States
- Name: USS Amagansett
- Namesake: Previous name retained
- Completed: 1879
- Acquired: 18 May 1917 (formally)
- Commissioned: 17 May 1917
- Decommissioned: 12 March 1919
- Stricken: 12 March 1919
- Fate: Returned to owner 12 March 1919
- Notes: Operated as commercial fishing trawler Amagansett 1879–1917 and from 1919

General characteristics
- Type: Patrol vessel and minesweeper
- Tonnage: 145 Gross register tons
- Displacement: 645 tons
- Length: 123 ft 6 in (37.64 m)
- Beam: 19 ft 6 in (5.94 m)
- Draft: 10 ft (3.0 m) aft
- Propulsion: Steam engine
- Speed: 7.8 knots
- Complement: 26
- Armament: 2 × 1-pounder guns

USS Amagansett (SP-693) was a United States Navy patrol vessel and minesweeper in commission from 1917 to 1920.

Amagansett was built as a commercial "menhaden fisherman"-type steam fishing trawler of the same name at Kennebunk, Maine, in 1879. In May 1917, the U.S. Navy acquired her from Mr. E. Benson Dennis of Cape Charles, Virginia, for use during World War I. Assigned the section patrol number 693, she was commissioned at Norfolk, Virginia, on 17 May 1917 as USS Amagansett (SP-693). The Navy officially chartered her from Dennis on 18 May 1917.

Fitted out as a minesweeper and assigned to the 5th Naval District, Amagansett was based at Norfolk throughout her naval career. She served on patrol and minesweeping duties in the Norfolk area through the end of World War I and until March 1919.

Amagansett was decommissioned on 12 March 1919 and stricken from the Navy Directory and returned to Dennis simultaneously the same day.
