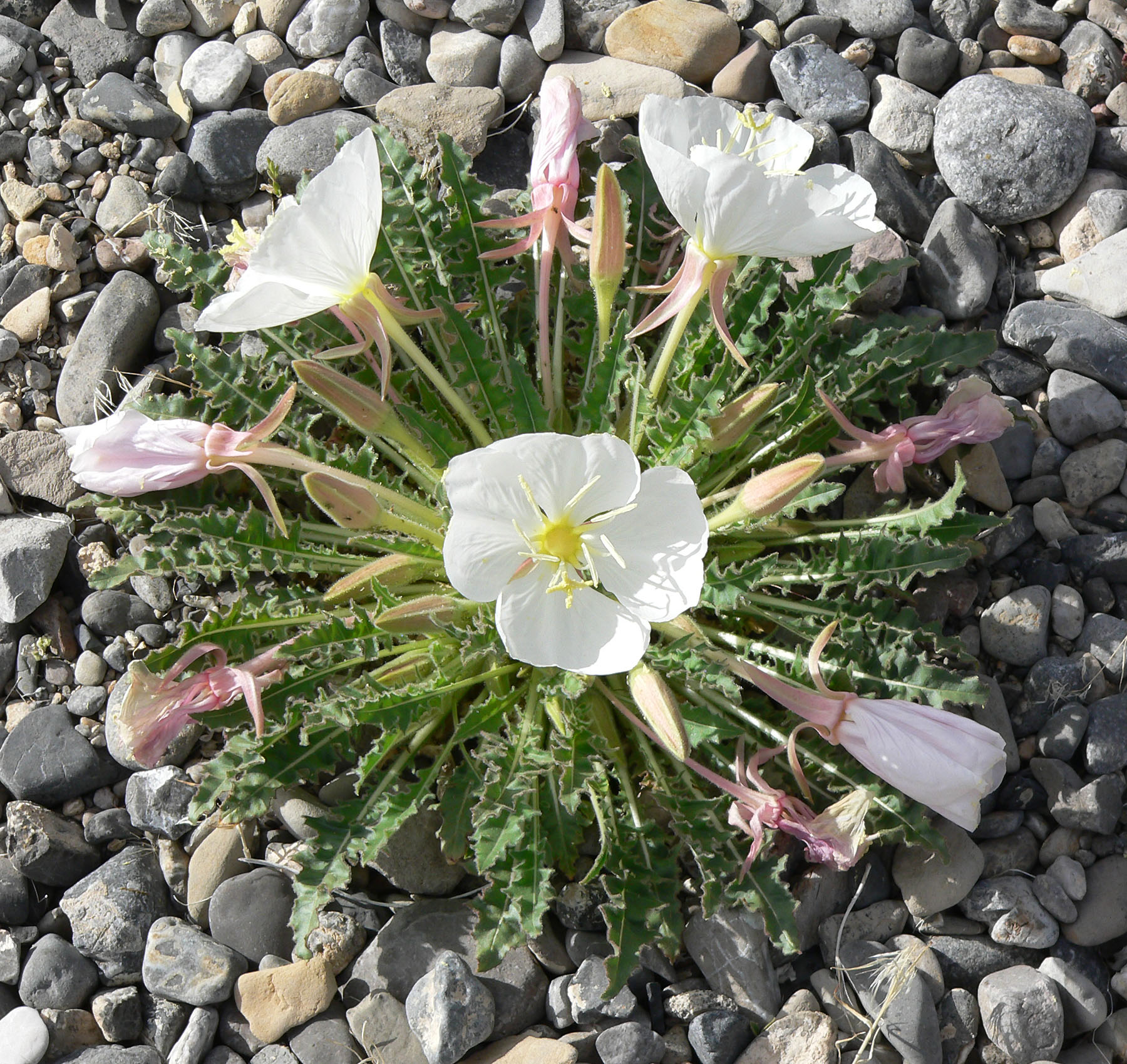
- Oenothera caespitosa subsp. marginata

Conservation status
- Secure (NatureServe)

Scientific classification
- Kingdom: Plantae
- Clade: Embryophytes
- Clade: Tracheophytes
- Clade: Angiosperms
- Clade: Eudicots
- Clade: Rosids
- Order: Myrtales
- Family: Onagraceae
- Genus: Oenothera
- Species: O. cespitosa

Binomial name
- Oenothera cespitosa Nutt.

Subspecies
- O. c. subsp. cespitosa; O. c. subsp. crinita; O. c. subsp. macroglottis; O. c. subsp. marginata; O. c. subsp. navajoensis

Synonyms
- Pachylophus cespitosa

= Oenothera cespitosa =

Plant species in the evening-primrose family

Oenothera cespitosa, known commonly as tufted evening-primrose or fragrant evening-primrose, is a perennial plant of the genus Oenothera native to western North America from the western edge of the Great Plains and all parts of the Intermountain West in a wide range of dry habitats. Its flowers are open at night and fade by the next day. The species is cultivated in gardens, particularly in its native range.

== Description ==
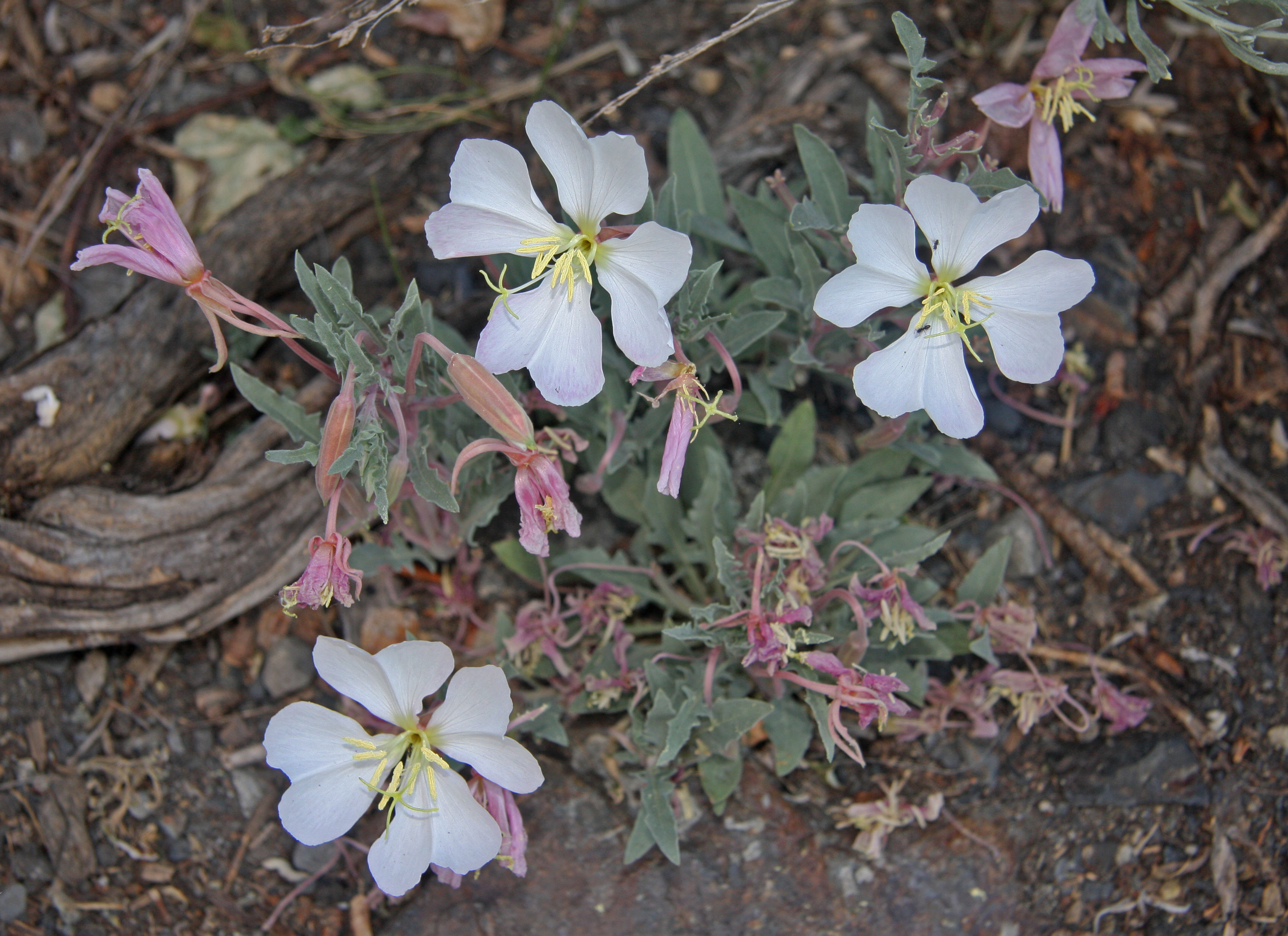
Oenothera cespitosa at dusk, Convict Lake, Mono County CA

Oenothera cespitosa is a low growing herbaceous plant that grows from a substantial taproot. Plants can have stems that can reach as much as 40 centimeters (16 in) in length or lack stems entirely. When present the stems are quite variable. They might be branched near the base or unbranched and are usually covered in fine glandular hairs, but can also be hairless on occasion. New shoots are sometimes produced the plant's slender, spreading side roots. Though the rest of the plant is herbaceous the caudex is woody.

The leaves grow together in a rosette. The leaves are sometimes hairless, but are more often puberulent, covered in small fine hairs, to villous-hirsute, covered in long hairs with a fine to coarse texture. They tend to be especially hairy on the leaf edges. Leaves range from 1.7 to 36 centimeters in length, but are usually shorter than 26 cm. They can be 0.3 to 6.5 cm wide, but are more commonly 0.5 to 4.5 cm. Normally they are oblanceolate to rhombic or spatulate in overall shape, but highly variable. The edges are irregualarly toothed, wavy, or even lobed and are narrowly pointed or rounded at the ends.

The four-petaled white flowers open in the afternoon to evening hours and remain open all night. The flowers wilt the next day when it becomes hot. The fading flower petals darken and turn light rose to dark rose purple. Pressed flowers are generally darker than those found on plants in nature. Open flowers produce a strong, sweet floral scent accompanied by a slight smell like rubber. Each petal can measure 1.6 to 6 centimeters (0.6 to 2.4 in) long, though more often 2–5 cm (0.8–2.0 in). A notch in the center of the petal may make them obcordate, heart shaped with the point attaching to floral tube, or they can be obovate, shaped like a teardrop. The flower has a long tube that extends to where it attaches to the plant.

Each flower bud develops by itself in a separate leaf axil, the crevice formed where the leaf's base attaches to the plant. Buds are closed by four sepals that measure 1.5 to 5.5 cm (0.6 to 2.2 in) long and that curve backwards separately when the flower is in bloom. On any evening during the bloom season each stem may produce one to six flowers. Depending on elevation the blooming season can start as early as April and end as late as August.

== Taxonomy ==
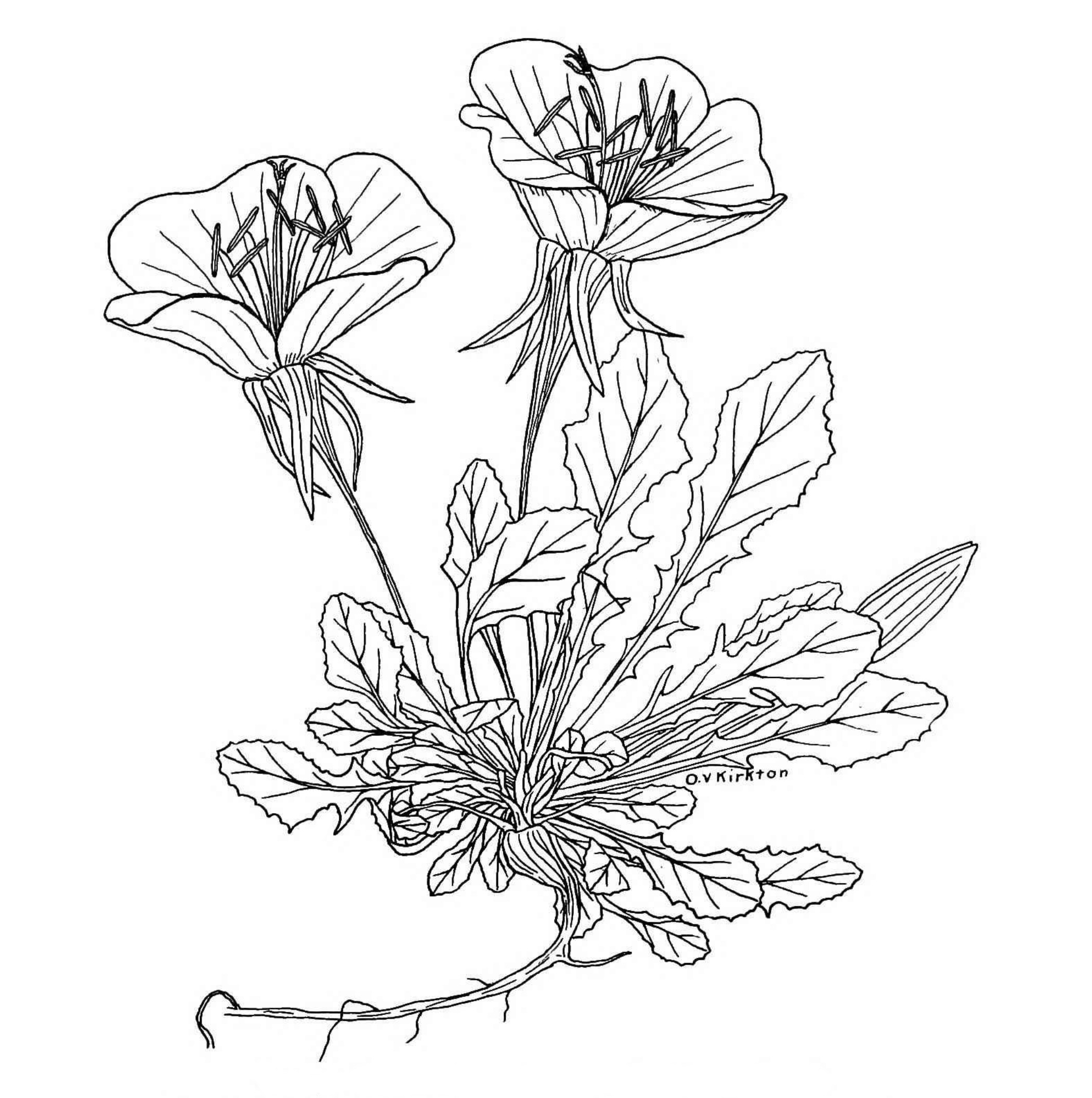
Illustrated by O.V. Kirkton, 1909

Oenothera cespitosa was described and given its scientific name by Thomas Nuttall sometime prior to August 1813. It has five accepted subspecies according to Plants of the World Online (POWO). However, according to the World Flora Online three of these are botanical varieties marked with asterisks in the following list.

- Oenothera cespitosa subsp. cespitosa*
- Oenothera cespitosa subsp. crinita (Rydb.) Munz*
- Oenothera cespitosa subsp. macroglottis (Rydb.) W.L.Wagner, Stockh. & W.M.Klein
- Oenothera cespitosa subsp. marginata (Nutt. ex Hook. & Arn.) Munz*
- Oenothera cespitosa subsp. navajoensis W.L.Wagner, Stockh. & W.M.Klein

According to POWO it has 40 synonyms of the species or one of its five subspecies.

Table of Synonyms
Name	Year	Rank	Synonym of:	Notes
Anogra longiflora A.Heller	1906	species	subsp. macroglottis	= het.
Oenothera cespitosa f. albiflora H.Lév.	1902	form	subsp. cespitosa	= het.
Oenothera cespitosa f. caulescens H.Lév.	1902	form	subsp. cespitosa	= het.
Oenothera cespitosa var. crinita (Rydb.) Munz	1931	variety	subsp. crinita	≡ hom.
Oenothera cespitosa subsp. eximia (A.Gray) Munz	1965	subspecies	subsp. marginata	= het.
Oenothera cespitosa var. eximia (A.Gray) Munz	1931	variety	subsp. marginata	= het.
Oenothera cespitosa subsp. jonesii (Munz) Munz	1965	subspecies	subsp. crinita	= het.
Oenothera cespitosa var. jonesii Munz	1931	variety	subsp. crinita	= het.
Oenothera cespitosa var. longiflora (A.Heller) Munz	1931	variety	subsp. macroglottis	= het.
Oenothera cespitosa var. macroglottis (Rydb.) Cronquist	1986	variety	subsp. macroglottis	≡ hom.
Oenothera cespitosa var. marginata (Nutt. ex Hook. & Arn.) Durand	1860	variety	subsp. marginata	≡ hom.
Oenothera cespitosa subsp. montana (Nutt.) Munz	1965	subspecies	subsp. cespitosa	= het.
Oenothera cespitosa var. montana (Nutt.) Durand	1860	variety	subsp. cespitosa	= het.
Oenothera cespitosa var. navajoensis (W.L.Wagner, Stockh. & W.M.Klein) Cronquist	1997	variety	subsp. navajoensis	≡ hom.
Oenothera cespitosa subsp. purpurea (S.Watson) Munz	1965	subspecies	subsp. cespitosa	= het.
Oenothera cespitosa var. purpurea (S.Watson) Munz	1931	variety	subsp. cespitosa	= het.
Oenothera cespitosa var. stellae S.L.Welsh	2003	variety	subsp. crinita	= het.
Oenothera cespitosa var. typica Munz	1931	variety	subsp. O. cespitosa	≡ hom., not validly publ.
Oenothera exigua A.Gray	1849	species	subsp. cespitosa	= het., orth. var.
Oenothera eximia A.Gray	1849	species	subsp. marginata	= het.
Oenothera idahoensis Mulford	1894	species	subsp. marginata	= het.
Oenothera marginata Nutt. ex Hook. & Arn.	1839	species	subsp. marginata	≡ hom.
Oenothera marginata var. purpurea S.Watson	1871	variety	subsp. cespitosa	= het.
Oenothera montana Nutt.	1840	species	subsp. cespitosa	= het.
Oenothera scapigera Pursh	1813	species	subsp. cespitosa	= het.
Pachylophus caulescens Rydb.	1904	species	subsp. navajoensis	= het.
Pachylophus cespitosa (Nutt.) Raim.	1893	species	subsp. O. cespitosa	≡ hom.
Pachylophus crinitus Rydb.	1917	species	subsp. crinita	≡ hom.
Pachylophus cylindrocarpus A.Nelson	1909	species	subsp. marginata	= het.
Pachylophus exiguus (A.Gray) Rydb.	1903	species	subsp. cespitosa	= het., orth. var.
Pachylophus eximius (A.Gray) Wooton & Standl.	1913	species	subsp. marginata	= het.
Pachylophus glaber A.Nelson	1904	species	subsp. cespitosa	= het.
Pachylophus hirsutus Rydb.	1904	species	subsp. macroglottis	= het.
Pachylophus longiflorus (A.Heller) A.Heller	1908	species	subsp. macroglottis	= het.
Pachylophus macroglottis Rydb.	1903	species	subsp. macroglottis	≡ hom.
Pachylophus marginatus (Nutt. ex Hook. & Arn.) Rydb.	1906	species	subsp. marginata	≡ hom.
Pachylophus montanus (Nutt.) A.Nelson	1899	species	subsp. cespitosa	= het.
Pachylophus nuttalliana Spach	1835	species	subsp. cespitosa	= het., orth. var.
Pachylophus nuttallii Spach	1835	species	subsp. cespitosa	= het.
Pachylophus prolatus A.Nelson	1938	species	subsp. marginata	= het.
Notes: ≡ homotypic synonym; = heterotypic synonym

=== Names ===
The species name, cespitosa, means "growing in a tuft". It has been spelled both cespitosa and as caespitosa in various sources, but according to Plants of the World Online the accepted spelling is cespitosa. The species is similarly known by the common names tufted evening-primrose or white-tufted evening-primrose. They are also known as gumbo evening-primrose. The common name of evening-primrose, used for many species in the genus, is attributed to the botanist John Goodyer due to the resemblance of the fragrance to that of the wild primroses (Primula) of Europe. However, they are not closely related as the primroses are in the family Primulaceae and the earliest use of evening-primrose recorded by the Oxford English Dictionary is in 1761 after the death of Goodyer.

It shares other common names with many other plant species. Along with Oenothera stricta it is called fragrant evening-primrose, together with Oenothera primiveris is called desert evening-primrose, with Oenothera tetraptera is called white evening-primrose, and with both genus Cistus and Helianthemum it is called rock rose.

They are occasionally called sand lilies or morning-lily, despite it not being part of the lily family. There are many other plant species known as sand lily.

== Range and habitat ==
Tufted evening primrose is native to western North America from southern Canada to northern Mexico. In Canada it grows in just three provinces, Alberta, Manitoba, and Saskatchewan. In Mexico it is found in four states, Baja California, Baja California Sur, Chihuahua, and Sonora.

The greater part of its range is in the western United States. There it grows in the interior areas of Washington and Oregon eastward through Idaho and Montana to encompass half of North and South Dakota. Southward it grows in just four far western counties of Nebraska, but in almost all of Wyoming, Colorado, and New Mexico. It is listed as growing in Texas by the Natural Resources Conservation Service, but without a specific location. It also native to all of Arizona, Utah, and Nevada, but only to a few dry areas of northeastern California and its southern deserts.

The species grows in a wide range of habitats including grasslands, desert scrub, piñon–juniper woodlands, Arizona chaparral, and into mountain conifer forests. Rarely, they can be found above timberline. They are particularly noted for growing in disturbed habitats such as next to roadways as well as on talus slopes and in sandy areas. Usually they grow in dry habitats. They regularly grow at elevations of 800 to 3,370 meters (2,620 to 11,060 ft) and rarely can grow as low as 450 m (1,480 ft).

== Ecology ==
The plant is a larval host to the white-lined sphinx moth (Hyles lineata). The very small moth Mompha definitella lays eggs in the flower buds and the larvae make galls where they feed.

Oenothera cespitosa is primarily dependent on large hawkmoths which hover over the flowers for pollination. The white-lined sphinx moth is the most frequent of the hawkmoth visitors. Other species in either the Sphinx or Manduca genus also seek out the blooms. Specifically noted species include the Vashti sphinx (Sphinx vashti), great ash sphinx (Sphinx chersis), and the five-spotted hawkmoth (Manduca quinquemaculata). Three unidentified species of moth from the family Noctuidae also pollinate the flowers at times.

Bees such as Lasioglossum aberrans and Lasioglossum lusoria also visit the blooms during the day, but Lasioglossum bees are primarily pollen thieves for the tufted evening-primrose. Large bees can at times be pollinators. For example, three bee species have been observed behaving as pollen thieves or as pollinators depending on conditions, Andrena anograe, Anthophora affabilis, and Anthophora dammersi. At least one other species in Anthophora and another in Agapostemon also behaves this way. A subspecies of the mountain carpenter bee (Xylocopa tabaniformis androleuca) will at times rob nectar and at times pollinate the species. One species of bumblebee (Bombus) and one in Tetraloniella is a conditional pollinator without stealing pollen.

== Similar species ==
Oenothera deltoides is similar, with short stems and slightly smaller flowers.

== Cultivation ==
Tufted evening-primroses are grown in rock gardens, moon gardens, and in native plant gardening. They are valued for attracting hawk moths, for their pleasant scent, and long blooming season of about six weeks in early to late summer. The plants require good drainage.
