= Sher Singhwala =

- Village
- Location in Punjab, India Sher Singhwala (India)
- Coordinates: 31.533864°N 75.494675°E
- Country: India
- State: Punjab
- District: Kapurthala

Government
  - Type: Panchayati raj (India)
  - Body: Gram panchayat

Population (2011)
  - Total: 389
- Sex ratio 200/189♂/♀

Languages
  - Official: Punjabi
  - Other spoken: Hindi
- Time zone: UTC+5:30 (IST)
- PIN: 144401
- Telephone code: 01822
- ISO 3166 code: IN-PB
- Vehicle registration: PB-09
- Website: kapurthala.gov.in

Sher Singhwala is a village in Bhulath Tehsil in Kapurthala district of Punjab State, India. It was established by Sher Singh Khaira, some time in the late 1800s, who owned the farm land. It is located 4 kilometres (2.5 mi) from Bhulath, 22 kilometres (14 mi) away from district headquarter Kapurthala. The village is administrated by a Sarpanch who is an elected representative of village as per the constitution of India and Panchayati raj (India).

== Demography ==
According to the report published by Census India in 2011, Sher Singhwala has 74 houses with the total population of 389 persons of which 200 are male and 189 females. Literacy rate of Sher Singhwala is 80.17%, higher than the state average of 75.84%. The population of children in the age group 0–6 years is 36 which is 9.25% of the total population. Child sex ratio is approximately 714, lower than the state average of 846.

== Population data ==
Particulars	Total	Male	Female
Total No. of Houses	74	-	-
Population	389	200	189
Child (0-6)	36	21	15
Schedule Caste	99	51	48
Schedule Tribe	0	0	0
Literacy	80.17 %	81.56 %	78.74 %
Total Workers	130	119	11
Main Worker	129	0	0
Marginal Worker	1	1	0

As per census 2011, 130 people were engaged in work activities out of the total population of Sher Singhwala which includes 119 males and 11 females. According to census survey report 2011, 99.23% workers (Employment or Earning more than 6 Months) describe their work as main work and 0.77% workers are involved in Marginal activity providing livelihood for less than 6 months.

== Caste ==
The village has schedule caste (SC) constitutes 25.45% of total population of the village and it doesn't have any Schedule Tribe (ST) population.

== List of cities near the village ==
- Bhulath
- Kapurthala
- Phagwara
- Sultanpur Lodhi

== Air travel connectivity ==
The closest International airport to the village is Sri Guru Ram Dass Jee International Airport.
