= Alkali Lake (Lander and Pershing counties, Nevada) =

- Location within Nevada Location within the United States
- Location: Lander County, Nevada and Pershing County, Nevada
- Coordinates: 40°24′58″N 117°19′13″W
- Type: Lake
- Surface elevation: 4,603 feet (1,403 m)

Alkali Lake is a lake in the U.S. state of Nevada.

Alkali Lake was so named on account of it being a soda lake or "alkaline lake" (a lake with high alkalinity).
