= USS Albatross (SP-1003) =

Patrol vessel of the United States Navy

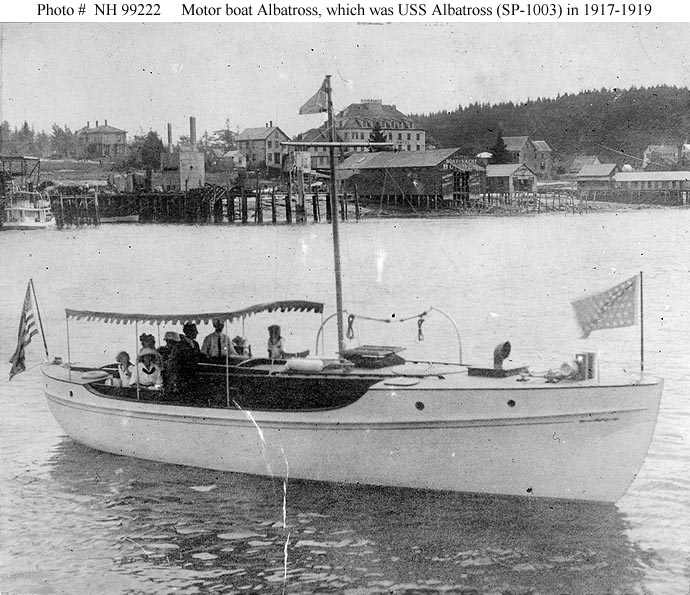
- Albatross (American Motor Boat, 1912) Photographed prior to World War I, probably in a Maine or Canadian Atlantic coast harbor. This craft served as USS Albatross (SP-1003) in 1917-1919.

History

United States
- Name: USS Albatross
- Builder: Adams Shipbuilding Co., East Boothbay, Maine
- Laid down: 1912
- Acquired: by lease, 1917
- Commissioned: 10 August 1917
- Reclassified: SP-1003, 1918
- Fate: Returned to owner, 1 May 1919

General characteristics
- Type: Wooden-hulled motor launch
- Displacement: 4 long tons (4 t)
- Length: 39 ft (12 m)
- Beam: 9 ft (2.7 m)
- Draft: 3 ft 3 in (0.99 m)
- Speed: 13 knots (24 km/h; 15 mph)
- Armament: 1 × machine gun

USS Albatross (SP-1003), a wooden-hulled motor launch built in 1912 by the Adams Shipbuilding Co., East Boothbay, Maine, was acquired by the U.S. Navy and classified as a section patrol craft under a free lease from John R. Rothery of Boston, Massachusetts, for service during World War I.

== Service history ==
=== World War I East Coast Operations ===
Fitted out at the Portsmouth Naval Shipyard in Kittery, Maine, and commissioned there on 10 August 1917, the vessel was assigned to the 1st Naval District in which she served as a section patrol boat until February 1919.

=== Post-War Decommissioning ===
Following a period in lay-up, she was returned to her owner, John R. Rothery of Boston, Massachusetts, 1 May 1919. Struck from the Navy list, (date unknown). Fate unknown.
