= Alkali Lake State Airport =

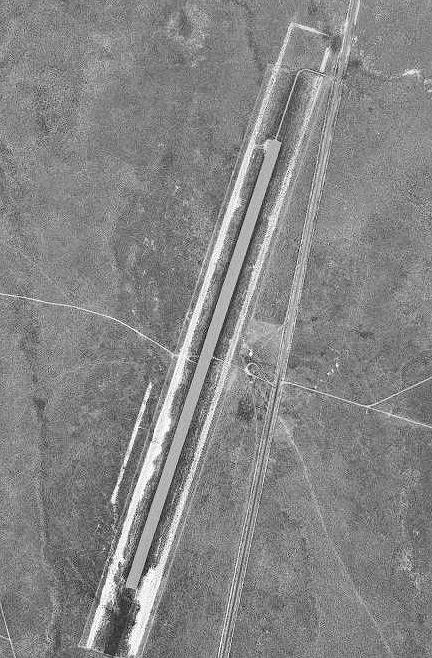
- 1994 USGS airphoto
- IATA: none; ICAO: - FAA: R03

Summary
- Airport type: Public
- Operator: Oregon Department of Aviation
- Location: Lake County, near Wagontire, Oregon
- Elevation AMSL: 4,312 ft / 1,314.3 m
- Coordinates: 43°05′14.5420″N 119°58′33.86″W
- Interactive map of Alkali Lake State Airport

Runways
| Direction | Length | | Surface |
| Direction | ft | m | Surface |
|---|---|---|---|
| 18/36 | 6,100 | 1,859 | Gravel |

Alkali Lake State Airport (FAA LID: R03), is a public airport located 8 miles (13 km) northeast of Alkali Lake in Lake County, Oregon, United States.

== History ==
The Alkali Lake State Airport was originally constructed in the early 1940s by the Oregon State Highway Department for the U.S. Bureau of Public Roads. The permit from the Bureau of Land Management for use of the land was transferred from Oregon State Highway Department to Oregon State Board of Aeronautics in 1956.

The location of Alkali Lake State Airport is important to the State's airport system from a geographic coverage and access standpoint. The airport is located west of U.S. Route 395 in south central Oregon, approximately 65 miles (105 km) north of the Lake County Airport and 40 miles (64 km) east of the Christmas Valley Airport. The airport's role in the system is primarily one of providing access to a remote, sparsely populated area. Alkali Lake State Airport is categorized as a level 5, non-NPIAS airport.

There is no lodging near Alkali Lake State Airport; however, airport camping is permitted. Campers are asked to remember that Alkali Lake is located in the dry Oregon high desert and to use care when staying at this location.
