= USS Audwin =

Patrol vessel of the United States Navy

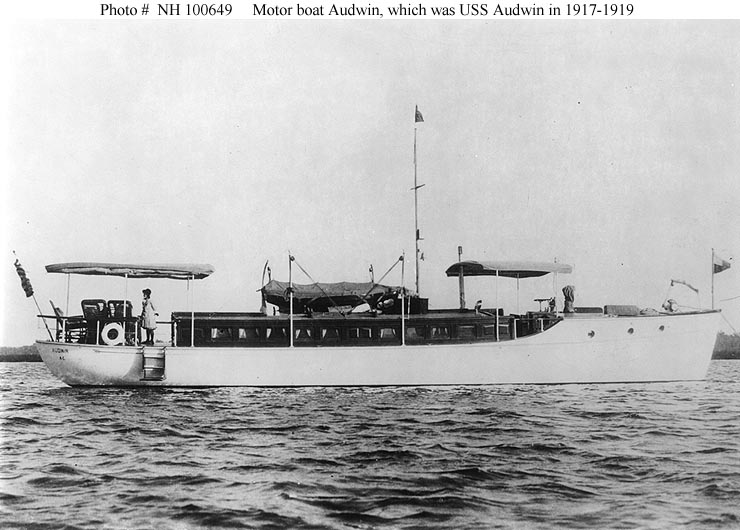
- Audwin as a private motorboat sometime between 1911 and 1917.

History

United States Navy
- Name: USS Audwin (SP-451)
- Namesake: Previous name retained
- Builder: New York Yacht, Launch and Engine Company, Morris Heights, Bronx, New York
- Completed: 1911
- Acquired: 30 June 1917
- Commissioned: 5 November 1917
- Decommissioned: 27 March 1919
- Fate: Transferred to U.S. Coast and Geodetic Survey 27 March 1919
- Notes: Operated as private motorboat Audwin 1911-1917

U.S. Coast and Geodetic Survey
- Name: USC&GS Audwin
- Namesake: Previous name retained
- Acquired: Transferred from U.S. Navy 27 March 1919
- Commissioned: 1919
- Decommissioned: 1927
- Fate: Sold 1927

General characteristics (as U.S. Navy patrol vessel)
- Type: Patrol vessel
- Displacement: 12.5 tons
- Length: 60 ft (18.3 m)
- Beam: 12 ft 6 in (3.8 m)
- Draft: 3 ft 6 in (1.1 m) (aft)
- Propulsion: Gasoline engine
- Speed: 10 mph
- Complement: 9
- Armament: 1 × 1-pounder gun; 1 × machine gun

USS Audwin (SP-451) was a patrol vessel that served in the United States Navy from 1917 to 1919. She then was a survey vessel in the United States Coast and Geodetic Survey from 1919 to 1927.

== Construction, acquisition, and commissioning ==
Audwin was built as a private motorboat in 1911 at Morris Heights in the Bronx, New York, by the New York Yacht, Launch and Engine Company. The U.S. Navy purchased her from M. C. Kimball of New York City on 30 June 1917 for use as a patrol vessel during World War I. After converting her for nava use, the Navy commissioned her at New York on 5 November 1917 as USS Audwin (SP-451) with Ensign Charles Laufer, USNRF, in command.

== U.S. Navy service ==
From her commissioning until May 1918, Audwin patrolled the coastal waters of the 3rd Naval District. In May 1918, she moved to the Great Lakes and spent the remainder of World War I patrolling in the 9th Naval District, operating out of Detroit, Michigan. In November 1918, she returned to New York and resumed patrol duty in the 3rd Naval District. She continued that service until 27 March 1919, when she was decommissioned and transferred to the United States Coast and Geodetic Survey. Her name was stricken from the Navy list that same day.

== U.S. Coast and Geodetic Survey service ==
Commissioned into the Coast and Geodetic Survey in 1919 as USC&GS Audwin, Audwin operated as a survey launch, conducting hydrographic surveys of the waters of the United States West Coast and the Territory of Alaska until 1927.

In 1927, Audwin was sold to P. H. McCue in Seattle, Washington.
