= Bhatnura Kalan =

- Village
- Location in Punjab, India Bhatnura Kalan (India)
- Coordinates: 31.567668°N 75.586616°E
- Country: India
- State: Punjab
- District: Kapurthala

Government
  - Type: Panchayati raj (India)
  - Body: Gram panchayat

Population (2011)
  - Total: 1,129
- Sex ratio 593/536♂/♀

Languages
  - Official: Punjabi
  - Other spoken: Hindi
- Time zone: UTC+5:30 (IST)
- PIN: 144636
- Telephone code: 01822
- ISO 3166 code: IN-PB
- Vehicle registration: PB-09
- Website: kapurthala.gov.in

Bhatnura Kalan is a village in Bhulath tehsil, Kapurthala district, Punjab state, India. It is located 9 kilometres (5.6 mi) from Bhulath and 27 kilometres (17 mi) from the district headquarters at Kapurthala. The village is administrated by a Sarpanch who is an elected representative of village. Kalan is Persian language word which means Big.

== List of cities near the village ==
- Bhulath
- Kapurthala
- Phagwara
- Sultanpur Lodhi

== Air travel connectivity ==
The closest International airport to the village is Sri Guru Ram Dass Jee International Airport.
