= Alkali Lake Chemical Waste Dump =

Coordinates: 42°58′3.36″N 120°2′48.84″W

Alkali Lake Chemical Waste Dump is a hazardous waste disposal site near the southwest edge of Alkali Lake, a seasonally dry playa in Lake County, Oregon. It is in the Summer Lake watershed. The site has been the focus of Oregon Department of Environmental Quality (DEQ) efforts to remediate a complex mix of toxic chemicals. Problems were initially caused by the dumping of hazardous waste near the lakebed between 1969 and 1971.

== Description ==
Beginning in February 1969, Chemical Waste Storage and Disposition, a Beaverton company, stored roughly 25,000 55-gallon drums of chemical waste near the shore of the playa with a permit from the Oregon Department of Agriculture. The drums contained pesticides including 2,4-D and MCPA herbicide residue containing chlorophenols, polymeric chlorophenoxyphenols and dioxins/furans (including 2,3,7,8-tetrachlorodibenzo-p-dioxin); metallic chloride waste, and paints and paint solvent. Chemical Waste Storage was contracted for waste disposal by the Chipman division of Rhodia, a Portland herbicide manufacturer, and by Oregon Metallurgical Corporation, a titanium producer. Further shipments were prohibited in 1971, due to improper waste handling practices. The State of Oregon took over the site in 1974, after losing legal actions against Chemical Waste Storage to force their compliance with new hazardous waste laws. First the Circuit Court and then the Court of Appeals determined that the company was financially unable to comply with the new regulations and that the State was to some extent complicit. In 1976, at a cost of $84,000, the state used bulldozers to push, crush and compact the leaking barrels into a dozen shallow, unlined, 400' long trenches, then covered them with soil.

This trench method was the least expensive option presented to the DEQ, and was chosen against scientific advisors' advice and protest. The United States Environmental Protection Agency's regional administrator over the area also opposed the trench remediation. The state released Chemical Waste Storage's owners from any liability in 1976.

According to the DEQ's 2007 factsheet, water testing results had revealed a subsurface plume extending about 2000' to the north-northwest of the dumpsite and covering at least 50 acres (20 ha) has contaminated the shallow groundwater aquifer at the site, but according to the DEQ, it has not expanded since their assessment of the area began in 1991. The area is polluted with dioxins: the soil contains up to 100 parts per trillion, and nearby groundwater is about 0.4 parts per trillion. A 3.9 miles (6.3 km) fence was installed to prevent grazing cattle from entering the area. The endangered Hutton Springs tui chub are only known to live at Hutton Spring, 1.5 miles (2.4 km) away. According to the United States Fish and Wildlife Service, "The DEQ has determined that the contaminated plume is spreading from east to west, away from Hutton Spring and thus does not currently constitute a threat to the water quality in Hutton Spring". Threatened western snowy plovers have also been observed at the lake, feeding on brine shrimp. A low-temperature methanogen extremophile, Methanohalophilus oregonense, was found at the dump site in 1989 by David Boone, an Oregon Graduate Institute scientist.

The dumpsite is currently surrounded by barbed wire. The trenches were recovered with a soil cap in 1993. The dumpsite is 10.3 acres (4.2 ha) and contains 50 monitoring wells. There are an estimated 800,000 to 1.4 million gallons of toxic waste at the site. Oregon has paid over $2 million for monitoring and to acquire land surrounding the dump. While the state of Oregon allocated a special fund for abandoned waste sites in 1991, it specifically does not cover the Alkali Lake site, which comes from the regular budget for DEQ.
