= Anado McLauchlin =

American mosaic artist (1947–2021)

Anado McLauchlin (May 24, 1947 - April 4, 2021) was a mosaic artist who lived in the small village of La Cieneguita, near San Miguel de Allende in central Mexico. Anado constructed a large scale compound known as Casa las Ranas written up in The New York Times, which includes the gallery known as The Chapel of Jimmy Ray which houses Anado's multi layered assemblages which he referred to as Artifacts from the Chapel.

McLauchlin was born in Oklahoma on May 24, 1947. He was drafted into the United States Navy in 1967 and served in Vietnam. He settled in New York City and changed his name from James Rayburn McLauchlin to Anado McLauchlin. He relocated to the west coast of the United States first living on a commune in the Cascade Mountains, then opening a gardening business in San Francisco. In 1998 he married Richard Schultz. The couple moved to La Cieneguita, Mexico, in 2001. He died on April 4, 2021.
