= Rhysopterus =

Scientific classification
- Kingdom: Plantae
- Clade: Tracheophytes
- Clade: Angiosperms
- Clade: Eudicots
- Clade: Asterids
- Order: Apiales
- Family: Apiaceae
- Genus: Rhysopterus; J.M.Coult. & Rose

Genus of plants

Rhysopterus is a genus of flowering plants belonging to the family Apiaceae.

Its native range is Western Central USA.

Species:

- Rhysopterus plurijugus J.M.Coult. & Rose
