= USS Actus =

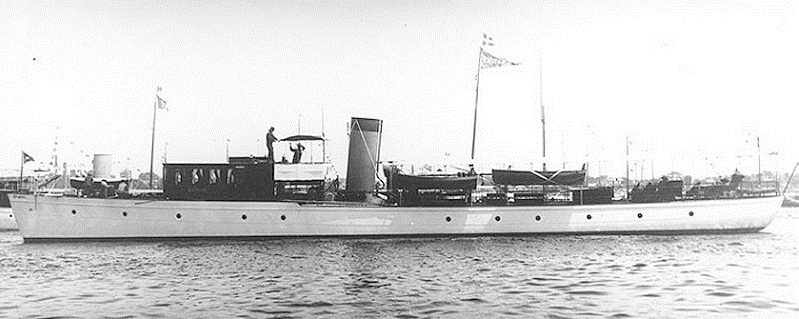
- USS Actus (SP-516)

History
- Name: Halawa; Actus (1910)
- Owner: Raymond Hoagland; George W. Childs Drexel (1910); E. B. Dane (1910–1917); U.S. Navy 1917; U.S. Army 1920
- Builder: George Lawley and Sons, Neponset, MA
- Launched: 1907
- Acquired: 26 May 1917, $40,000
- Commissioned: 18 April 1917
- Decommissioned: 8 July 1919
- Stricken: 17 July 1919

General characteristics
- Displacement: 99 tons
- Length: 120 ft 0 in (36.58 m) LOA; 107 ft 8 in (32.82 m) Registered
- Beam: 15 ft (4.6 m)
- Draft: 5 ft 6 in (1.68 m)
- Propulsion: steam
- Speed: 15 knots (28 km/h; 17 mph)
- Complement: 23
- Armament: two 3-pounders

Soon after the United States entered World War I, Actus (SP-516) — a yacht constructed in 1907 at Neponset, Massachusetts, by George Lawley & Sons — was taken over by the US Navy as a section patrol craft from Mr. E. B. Dane; commissioned on 1 April 1917, with Ensign H. A. D. Cameron, USNR, in command; and, on 26 May 1917, over a month later, formally purchased by the Government.

Assigned to the 1st Naval District, Actus spent the entire war patrolling Cape Cod Bay and the harbors of Boston and Plymouth. After the war ended in November 1918, she continued to serve the Navy at the Boston Navy Yard in some type of yard craft status. She also performed some unspecified service for the Naval Overseas Transportation Service office at Boston in May and June 1919. She was decommissioned at Quincy, Mass., on 8 July 1919. A little over a year later, on 20 July 1920, she was transferred to the War Department. Presumably, her name was struck from the Navy list at about the same time.

The vessel was an Engineer Corps survey boat based in Savannah, Georgia in 1921.
