= Metlan Khairabad =

- Village
- Location in Punjab, India Metlan Khairabad (India)
- Coordinates: 31.147130°N 75.341218°E
- Country: India
- State: Punjab
- District: Kapurthala

Government
  - Type: Panchayati raj (India)
  - Body: Gram panchayat

Population (2011)
  - Total: 974
- Sex ratio 502/472♂/♀

Languages
  - Official: Punjabi
  - Other spoken: Hindi
- Time zone: UTC+5:30 (IST)
- PIN: 144622
- Telephone code: 01822
- ISO 3166 code: IN-PB
- Vehicle registration: PB-09
- Website: kapurthala.gov.in

Metlan Khairabad is a village in Bhulath Tehsil in Kapurthala district of Punjab State, India. It is located 3 kilometres (1.9 mi) from Bhulath, 27 kilometres (17 mi) away from district headquarter Kapurthala. The village is administrated by a Sarpanch who is an elected representative.

== Demography ==
According to the 2011 Census of India, Metlan Khairabad had 211 houses with the total population of 974 persons of which 502 were male and 472 female. The literacy rate was 76.10%, higher than the state average of 75.84%. The population of children in the age group 0–6 years was 112 and the child sex ratio was approximately 672, lower than the state average of 846.

At that time, 444 people were engaged in work activities, being 323 males and 121 females. 64.19% workers (Employment or Earning more than 6 Months) describe their work as main work and 35.81% workers are involved in Marginal activity providing livelihood for less than 6 months.

== List of cities near the village ==
- Phagwara
- Sultanpur Lodhi

== Air travel connectivity ==
The closest international airport to the village is Sri Guru Ram Dass Jee International Airport.
