= USS Anado =

Patrol vessel of the United States Navy

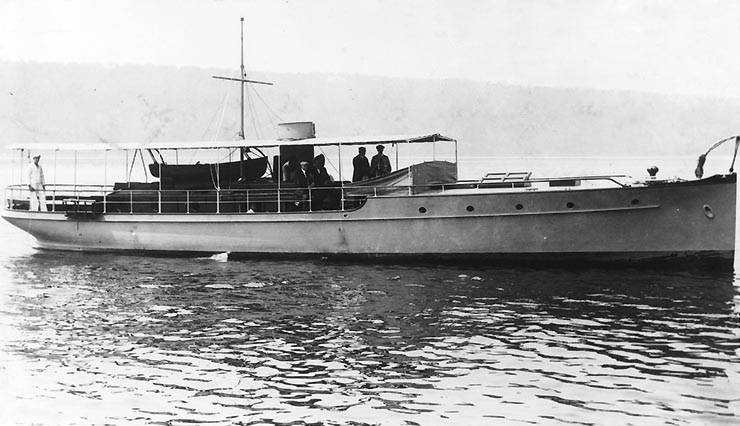
- Anado in private use in 1917, prior to her United States Navy service.

History

United States
- Name: USS Anado
- Namesake: Previous name retained
- Builder: Gas Engine and Power Company and Charles L. Seabury Company, Morris Heights, the Bronx, New York
- Completed: 1917
- Acquired: 8 July 1917
- Commissioned: 17 August 1917
- Stricken: 26 February 1919
- Fate: Returned to owner 26 February 1919
- Notes: Operated as private motorboat Anado 1917 and from 1919

General characteristics
- Type: Patrol vessel
- Tonnage: 33 gross register tons
- Length: 70 ft (21 m)
- Beam: 13 ft (4.0 m)
- Draft: 3 ft (0.91 m) aft
- Speed: 20 miles per hour
- Complement: 10

USS Anado (SP-455) was a United States Navy patrol vessel in commission from 1917 to 1919.

Anado was built as a private motorboat of the same name in 1917 by the Gas Engine and Power Company and the Charles L. Seabury Company at Morris Heights, the Bronx, New York. On 8 July 1917, the U.S. Navy acquired her under a free lease from her owner, Mr. J. A. Mollenhauer of Brooklyn, New York, for use as a section patrol vessel during World War I. She was commissioned as USS Anado (SP-455) on 17 August 1917.

Assigned to the 3rd Naval District, Anado carried out patrol duties in the New York City and Long Island, New York, area for the remainder of World War I.

Anado was stricken from the Navy List on 26 February 1919 and returned to Mollenhauer the same day.
