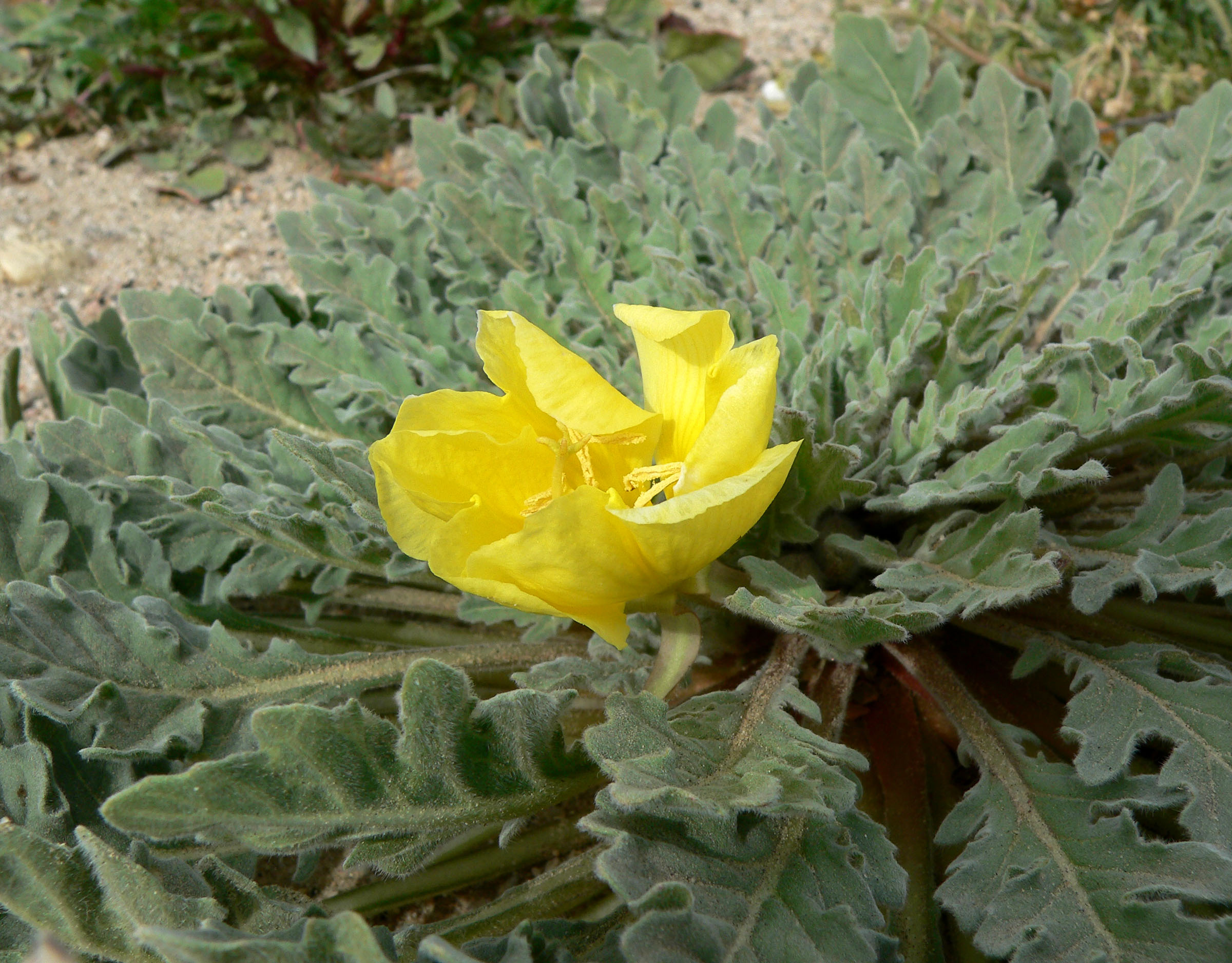
- Oenothera primiveris subsp. bufonis

Scientific classification
- Kingdom: Plantae
- Clade: Tracheophytes
- Clade: Angiosperms
- Clade: Eudicots
- Clade: Rosids
- Order: Myrtales
- Family: Onagraceae
- Genus: Oenothera
- Species: O. primiveris

Binomial name
- Oenothera primiveris A.Gray

= Oenothera primiveris =

Species of flowering plant

Oenothera primiveris is a species of flowering plant in the evening primrose family known by the common names yellow desert evening primrose, bottle evening-primrose, and desert evening-primrose.

== Habitat ==
It is native to the southwestern United States and northern Mexico.

It grows below 4,500 feet (1,400 m) in many types of flat desert habitats, including Creosote bush scrub, Joshua tree woodland, and Pinyon-juniper woodland. It is found in the Mojave Desert.

== Description ==
Oenothera primiveris is a hairy annual herb producing a dense rosette of leaves in which the inflorescence occurs. There is generally no true stem.

The green or grayish leaves are up to 28 centimeters long and have wavy or crinkled edges, or are cut into deep lobes or teeth.

Flowers arise from the axils of the leaves. Each flower has yellow petals up to 4 centimetres (1.6 in) in length which fade orange or red with age. Its bloom period is February through May.

The fruit is a straight or curving capsule up to 6 centimetres (2.4 in) in length.

=== Subspecies ===
- Oenothera primiveris subsp. bufonis — Large yellow desert primrose, endemic to the Mojave Desert in California & Nevada.
- Oenothera primiveris subsp. primiveris
