= Boparai, Bhulath =

Boparai
- Village
- Location in Punjab, India Boparai (India)
- Coordinates: 31.555808°N 75.549350°E
- Country: India
- State: Punjab
- District: Kapurthala

Government
  - Type: Panchayati raj (India)
  - Body: Gram panchayat

Population (2011)
  - Total: 2,001
- Sex ratio 1021/980♂/♀

Languages
  - Official: Punjabi
  - Other spoken: Hindi
- Time zone: UTC+5:30 (IST)
- PIN: 144622
- Telephone code: 01822
- ISO 3166 code: IN-PB
- Vehicle registration: PB-09
- Website: kapurthala.gov.in

Boparai is a village in Bhulath Tehsil in Kapurthala district of Punjab State, India. It is located 7 kilometres (4.3 mi) from Bhulath, 30 kilometres (19 mi) away from district headquarter Kapurthala. The village is administrated by a Sarpanch, who is an elected representative.

== Demography ==
According to the report published by Census India in 2011, Boparai has 424 houses with the total population of 2,001 persons of which 1,021 are male and 980 females. Literacy rate of Boparai is 78.63%, higher than the state average of 75.84%. The population of children in the age group 0–6 years is 190 which is 9.50% of the total population. Child sex ratio is approximately 652, lower than the state average of 846.

== Population data ==
| Particulars | Total | Male | Female |
|---|---|---|---|
| Total No. of Houses | 424 | - | - |
| Population | 2,001 | 1,021 | 980 |
| Child (0–6) | 190 | 115 | 75 |
| Schedule Caste | 575 | 290 | 285 |
| Schedule Tribe | 0 | 0 | 0 |
| Literacy | 78.63 % | 81.13 % | 76.13 % |
| Total Workers | 564 | 503 | 61 |
| Main Worker | 327 | 0 | 0 |
| Marginal Worker | 237 | 206 | 31 |

As per census 2011, 564 people were engaged in work activities out of the total population of Boparai which includes 503 males and 61 females. According to census survey report 2011, 57.98% workers (Employment or Earning more than 6 Months) describe their work as main work and 42.02% workers are involved in Marginal activity providing livelihood for less than 6 months.

== Caste ==
The village has schedule caste (SC) constitutes 28.74% of total population of the village and it doesn't have any Schedule Tribe (ST) population.

== List of cities near the village ==
- Bhulath
- Kapurthala
- Phagwara
- Sultanpur Lodhi

== Air travel connectivity ==
The closest International airport to the village is Sri Guru Ram Dass Jee International Airport.
