= USS Akela =

Patrol vessel of the United States Navy

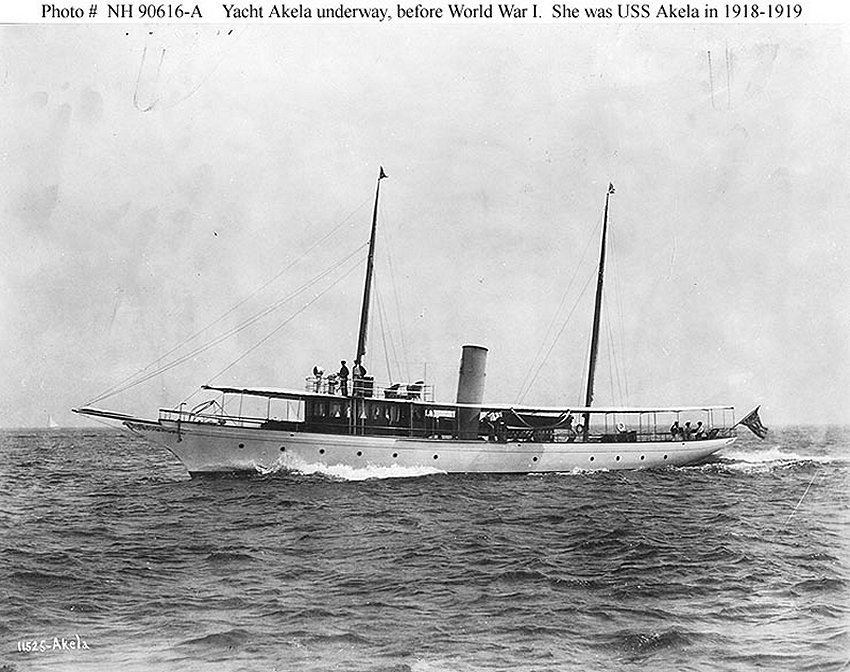
- Underway prior to World War I.

History

United States
- Name: USS Akela (SP-1793)
- Builder: Gas Engine and Power Co. and the Charles L. Seabury Co., Morris Heights, N.Y.
- Launched: 1899
- Acquired: 24 December 1917
- Commissioned: 16 April 1918
- Stricken: 15 May 1919
- Fate: Scrapped in 1935

General characteristics
- Displacement: 72 t
- Length: 117 ft 6 in (35.81 m)
- Beam: 14 ft 6 in (4.42 m)
- Draft: 4 ft 8 in (1.42 m)
- Propulsion: two triple-expansion engines, two shafts
- Speed: 12 knots (22 km/h)
- Complement: 15
- Armament: none

The wooden-hulled, twin-screw, steam yacht Akela—built in 1899 at Morris Heights, N.Y., by the Gas Engine and Power Co. and the Charles L. Seabury Co.—was acquired by the Navy from Bridgeport, Connecticut businessman Henry Alfred Bishop and delivered on 24 December 1917. Redesignated USS Akela (SP-1793) was commissioned at the New York Navy Yard on 16 April 1918.

Assigned to the Armed Guard Inspection Board of the 3d Naval District, Akela took inspection parties to various merchant ships with embarked armed guard detachments over the next several months. Entering the Seabury yard at Morris Heights on 6 November, Akela was still there, undergoing repairs, when the armistice was signed on 11 November 1918. She remained there, inactive and "awaiting orders", into the spring of 1919. The last formal entry in the ship's log, dated 15 April, does not report a formal decommissioning. In any case, the ship was returned to her owner on that day and stricken from the Navy list exactly one month later.
