= Fatehpur, Bhulath =

Fatehpur
- Village
- Location in Punjab, India Fatehpur (India)
- Coordinates: 31.558423°N 75.565588°E
- Country: India
- State: Punjab
- District: Kapurthala

Government
  - Type: Panchayati raj (India)
  - Body: Gram panchayat

Population (2011)
  - Total: 239
- Sex ratio 128/111♂/♀

Languages
  - Official: Punjabi
  - Other spoken: Hindi
- Time zone: UTC+5:30 (IST)
- PIN: 144622
- Telephone code: 01822
- ISO 3166 code: IN-PB
- Vehicle registration: PB-09
- Website: kapurthala.gov.in

Fatehpur is a village in Bhulath Tehsil in Kapurthala district of Punjab State, India. It is located 9 kilometres (5.6 mi) from Bhulath, 33 kilometres (21 mi) away from district headquarter Kapurthala. The village is administrated by a Sarpanch who is an elected representative of village as per the constitution of India and Panchayati raj (India).

== Demography ==
According to the report published by Census India in 2011, Fatehpur has 48 houses with the total population of 239 persons of which 128 are male and 111 females. Literacy rate of Fatehpur is 79.72%, higher than the state average of 75.84%. The population of children in the age group 0–6 years is 27 which is 11.30% of the total population. Child sex ratio is approximately 500, lower than the state average of 846.

== Population data ==
Particulars	Total	Male	Female
Total No. of Houses	48	-	-
Population	239	128	111
Child (0-6)	27	18	9
Schedule Caste	58	31	27
Schedule Tribe	0	0	0
Literacy	79.72 %	83.64 %	75.49 %
Total Workers	79	76	3
Main Worker	74	0	0
Marginal Worker	5	4	1

As per census 2011, 79 people were engaged in work activities out of the total population of Fatehpur which includes 76 males and 3 females. According to census survey report 2011, 93.67% workers (Employment or Earning more than 6 Months) describe their work as main work and 6.33% workers are involved in Marginal activity providing livelihood for less than 6 months.

== Caste ==
The village has schedule caste (SC) constitutes 24.27% of total population of the village and it doesn't have any Schedule Tribe (ST) population.

== List of cities near the village ==
- Bhulath
- Kapurthala
- Phagwara
- Sultanpur Lodhi

== Air travel connectivity ==
The closest International airport to the village is Sri Guru Ram Dass Jee International Airport.
