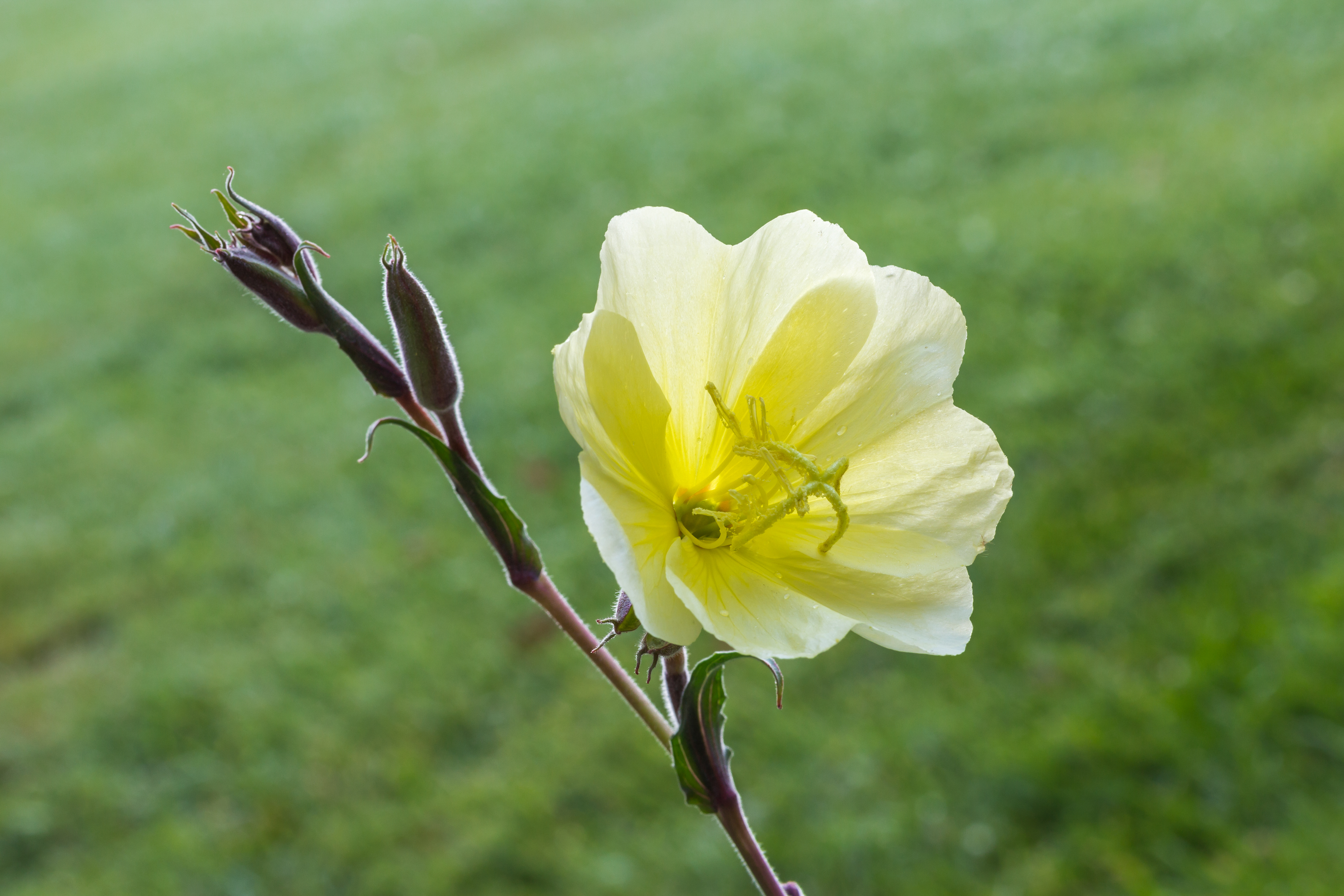
- Close-up of flower
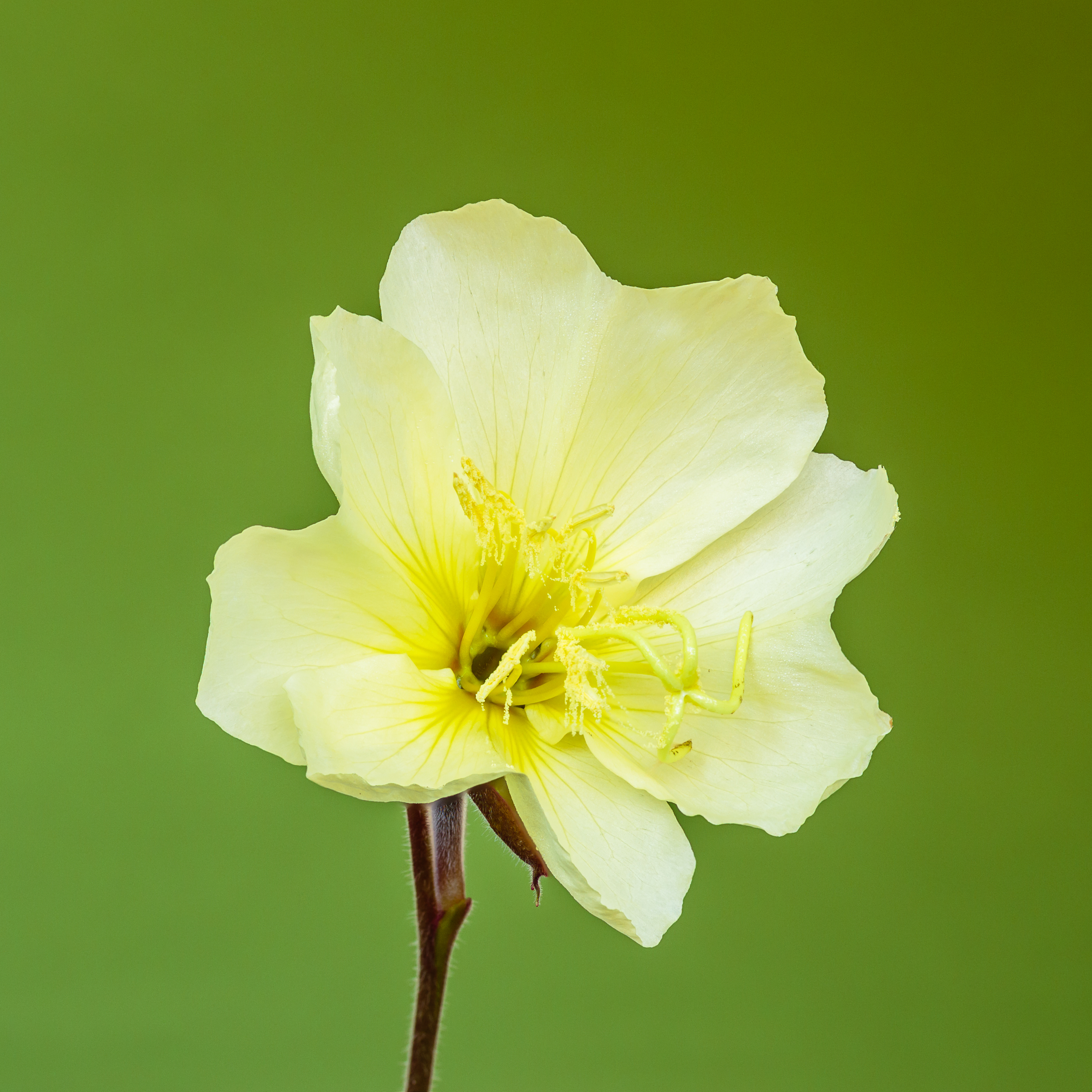
- 'Sulphurea' cultivar

Scientific classification
- Kingdom: Plantae
- Clade: Tracheophytes
- Clade: Angiosperms
- Clade: Eudicots
- Clade: Rosids
- Order: Myrtales
- Family: Onagraceae
- Genus: Oenothera
- Species: O. stricta

Binomial name
- Oenothera stricta Ledeb. ex Link

Synonyms
- List: Oenothera agari R.R.Gates; Oenothera arguta Greene; Oenothera brachysepala Spach; Oenothera bracteata Phil.; Oenothera bracteata var. glabrescens (Phil.) Reiche; Oenothera bulgarica Delip.; Oenothera glabrescens Phil.; Oenothera mollissima subsp. propinqua (Spach) Thell.; Oenothera mollissima var. valdiviana Reiche; Oenothera polymorpha var. brachysepala (Spach) H.Lév.; Oenothera polymorpha var. stricta (Ledeb. ex Link) H.Lév.; Oenothera propinqua Spach; Oenothera propinqua var. parsiflora Phil.; Oenothera striata Link; Oenothera stricta var. propinqua (Spach) Reiche; Oenothera sulfurea H.Lév.; Oenothera valdiviana Phil.; Onagra arguta (Greene) Small; Raimannia arguta (Greene) Bartlett ex A.Heller

= Oenothera stricta =

Species of plant

Oenothera stricta, the fragrant evening primrose (a name it shares with other members of its genus), is a species of flowering plant in the family Onagraceae. It is native to the Desventuradas Islands, Chile, and southern Argentina, and it has been introduced to many locations around the world. The unimproved species is available from commercial suppliers, as is a cultivar, 'Sulphurea'. The Royal Horticultural Society considers both to be good plants to attract pollinators.

== Subtaxa ==
The following subspecies are accepted:

- Oenothera stricta subsp. altissima W.Dietr. – southern Argentina
- Oenothera stricta subsp. stricta – Desventuradas Islands, Chile, introduced worldwide
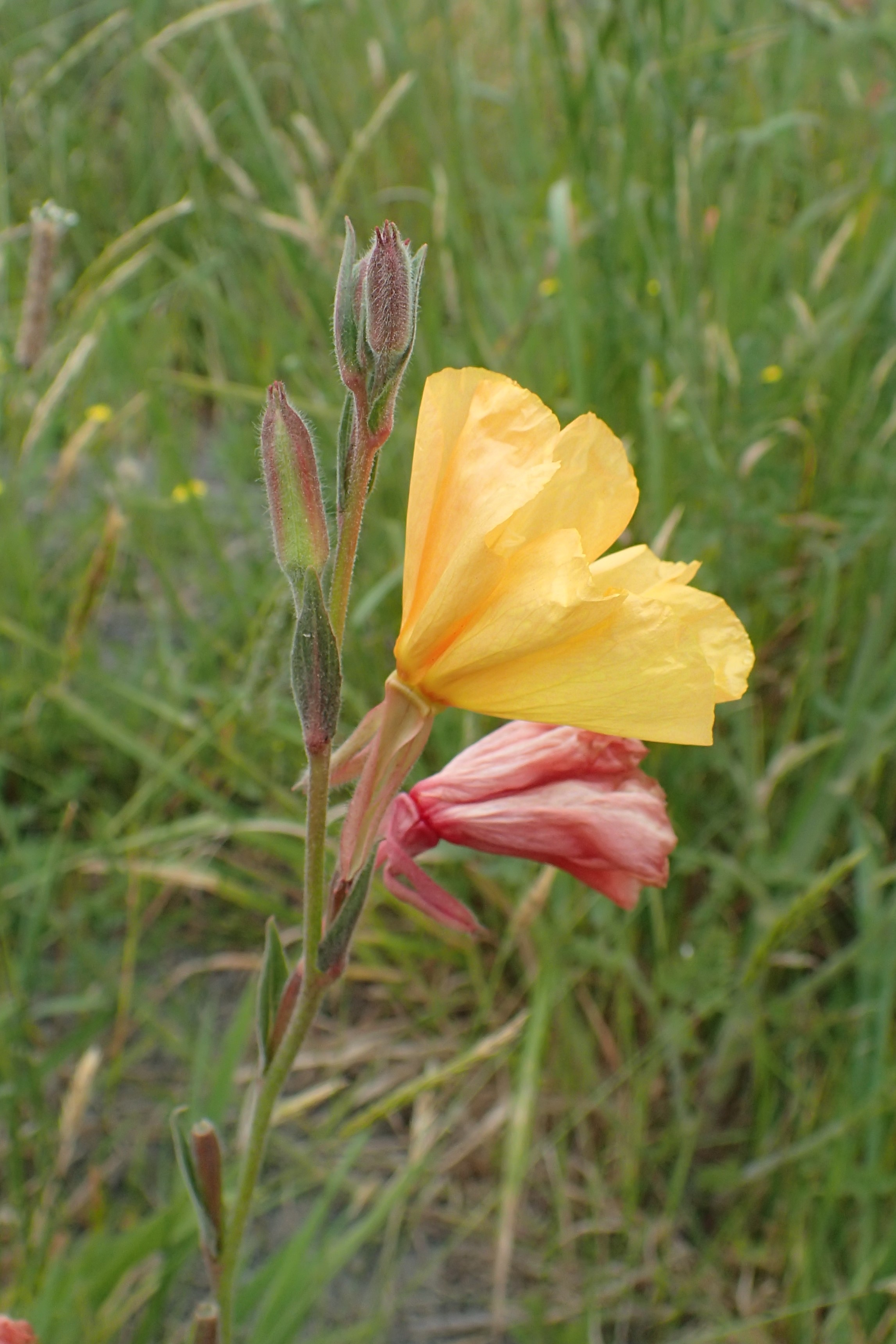
Side view of flowers

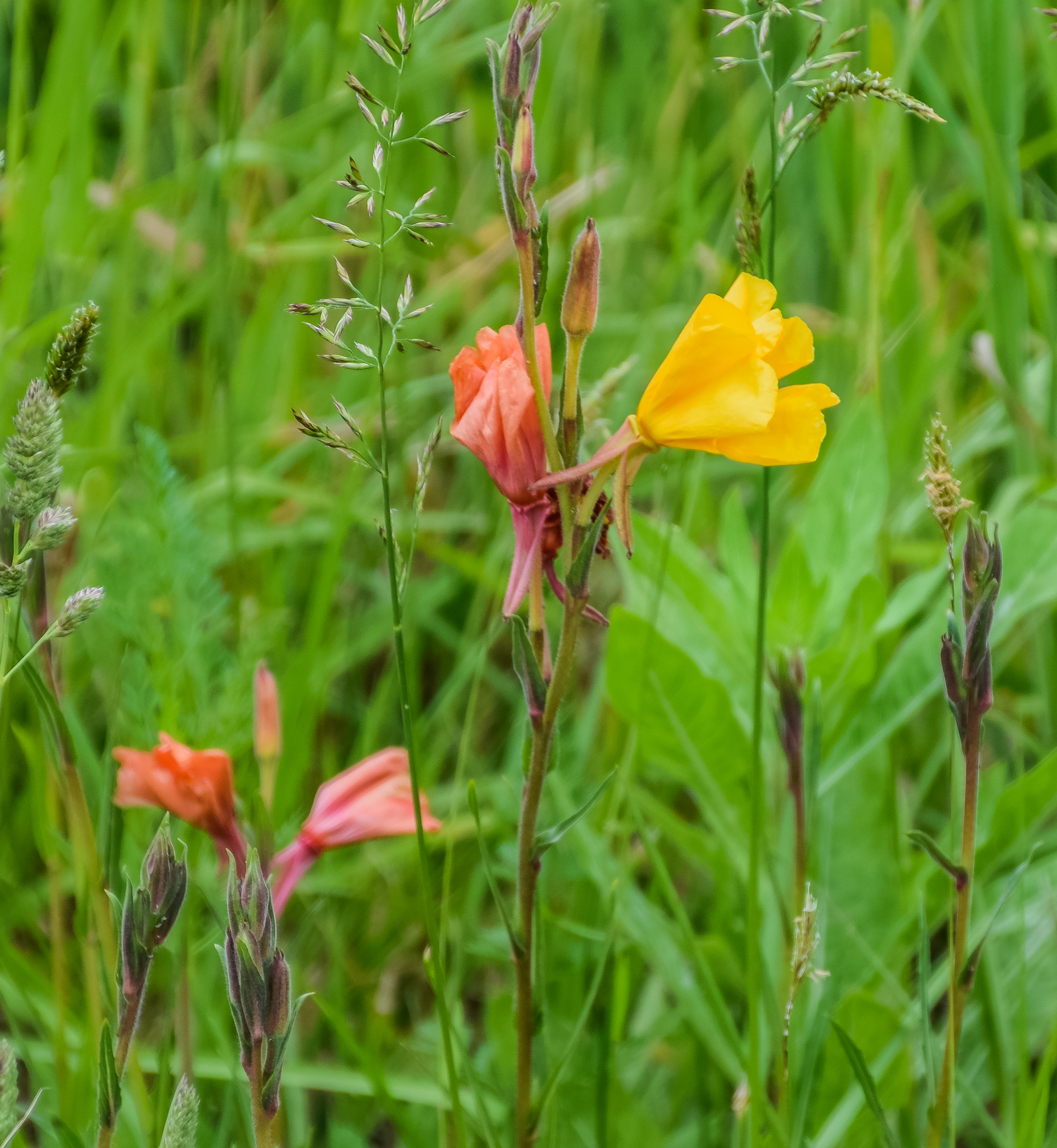
In New Zealand

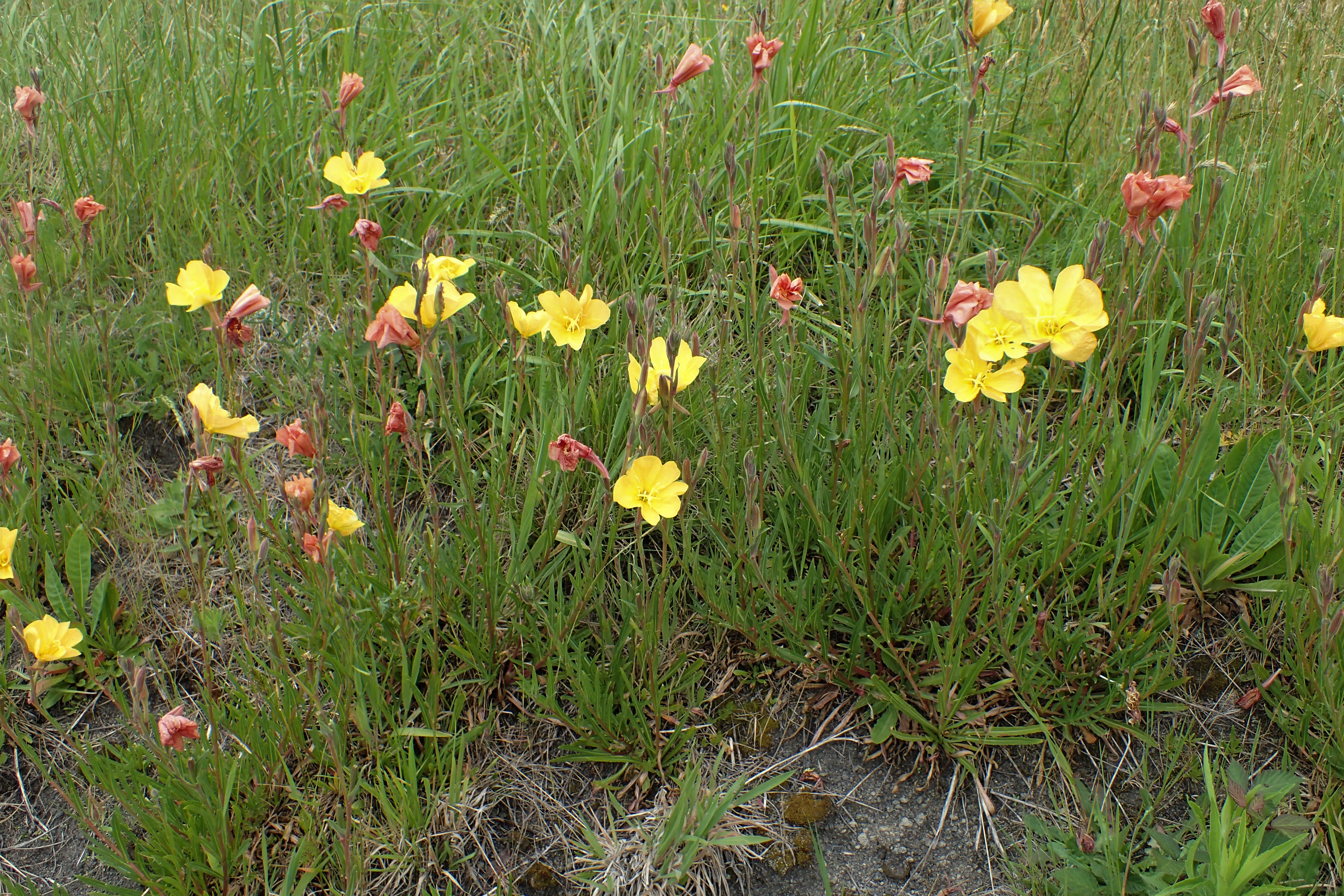
A grouping

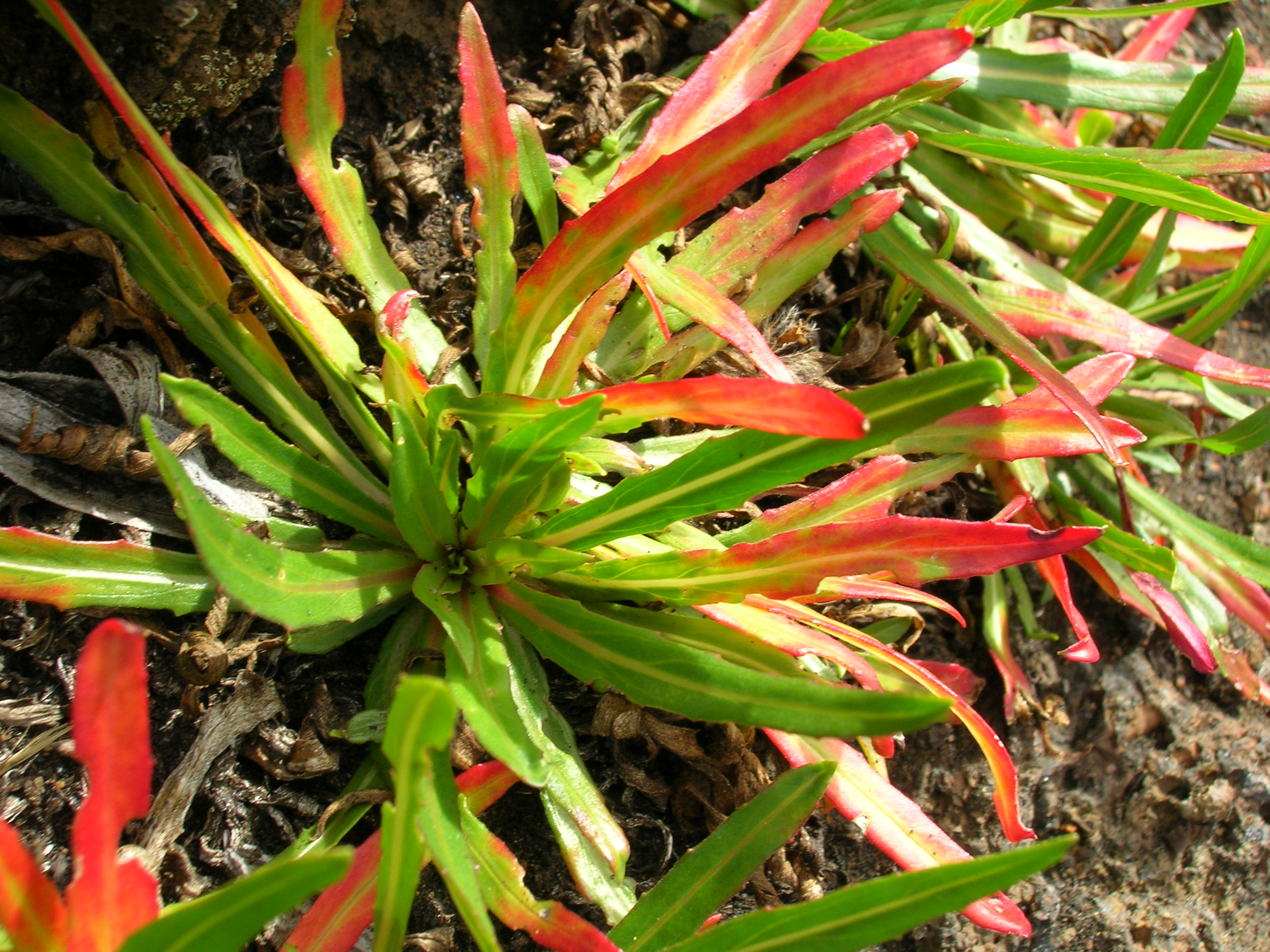
Leaves form a rosette

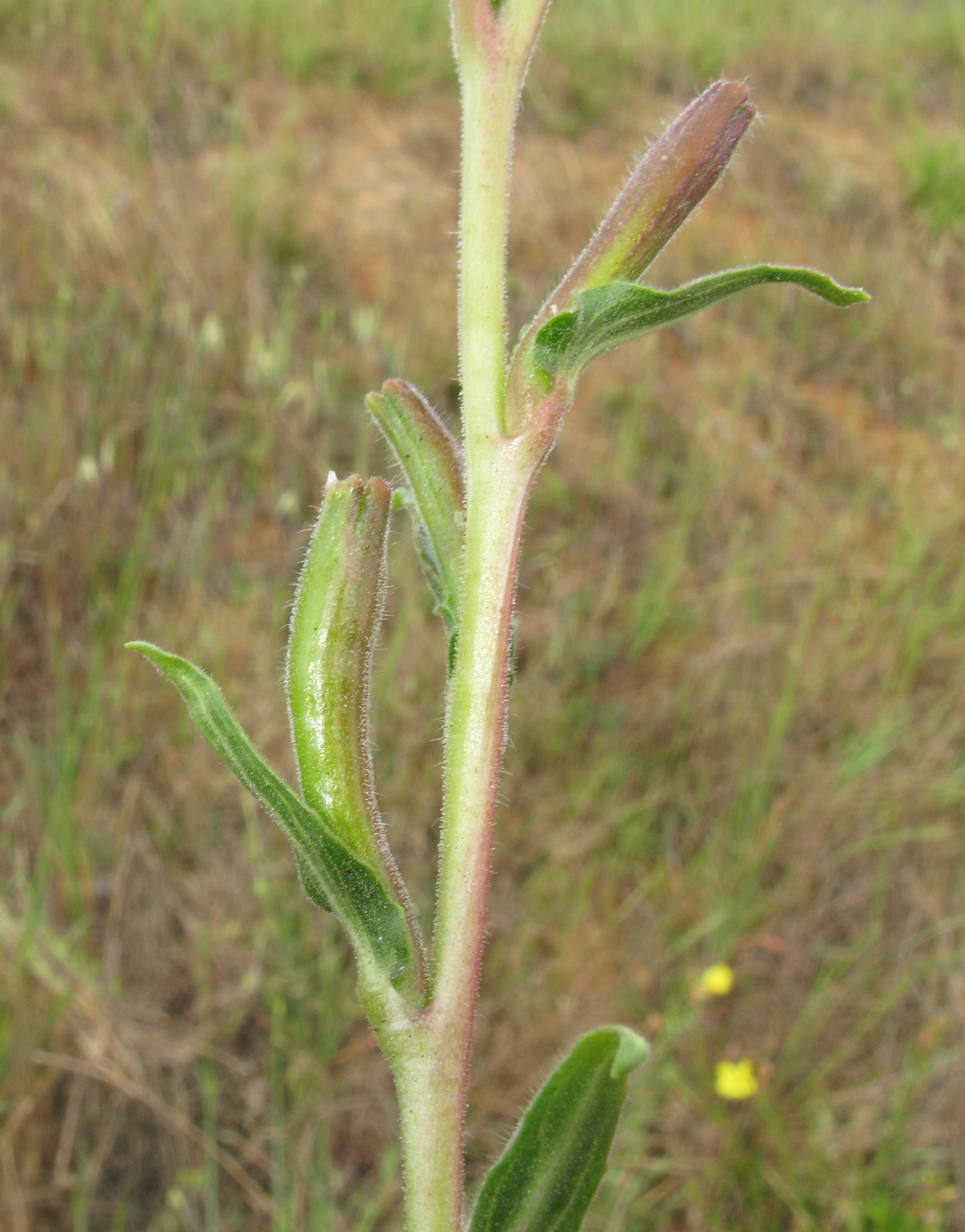
Fruit are pod-like

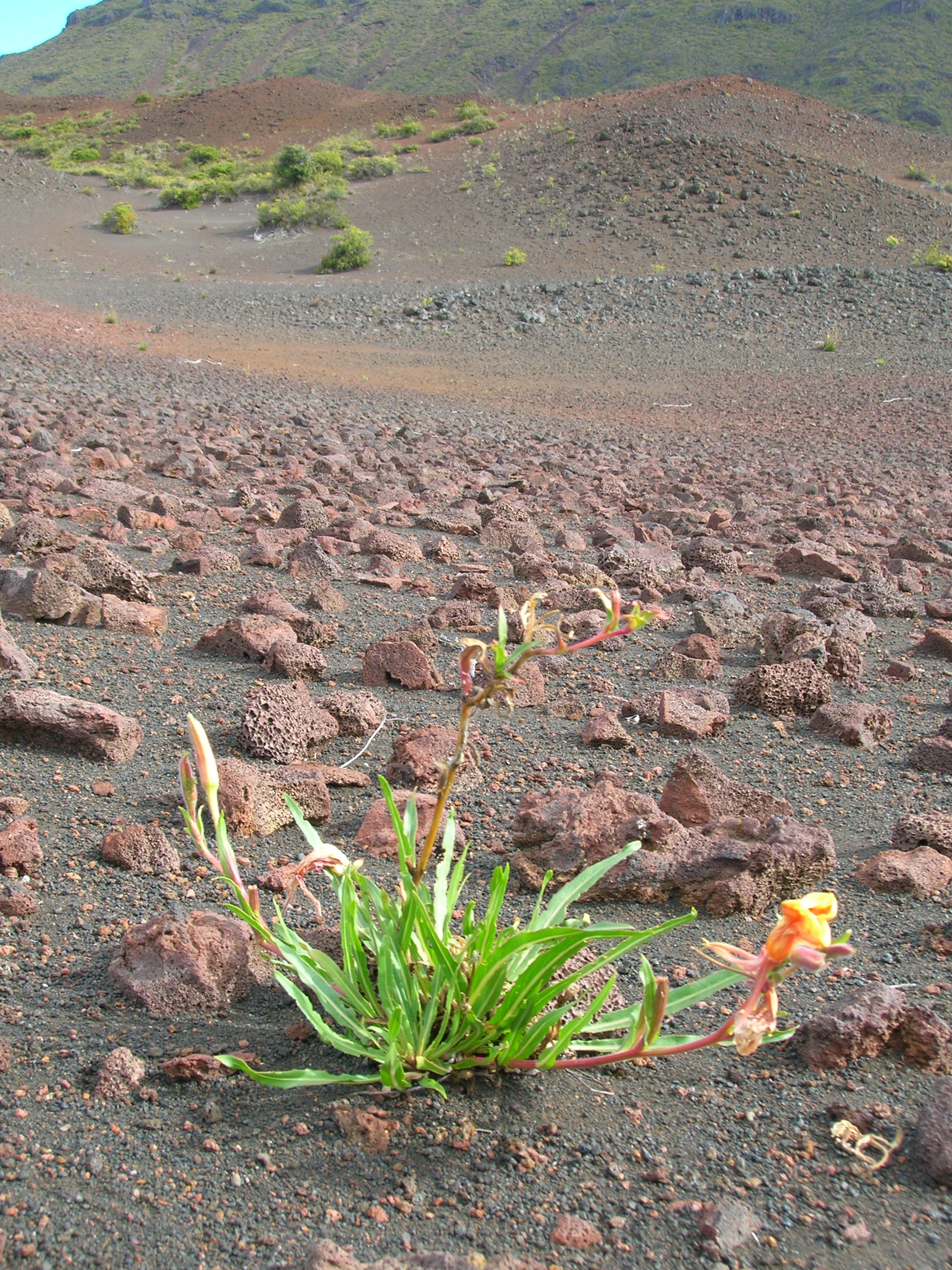
On Maui

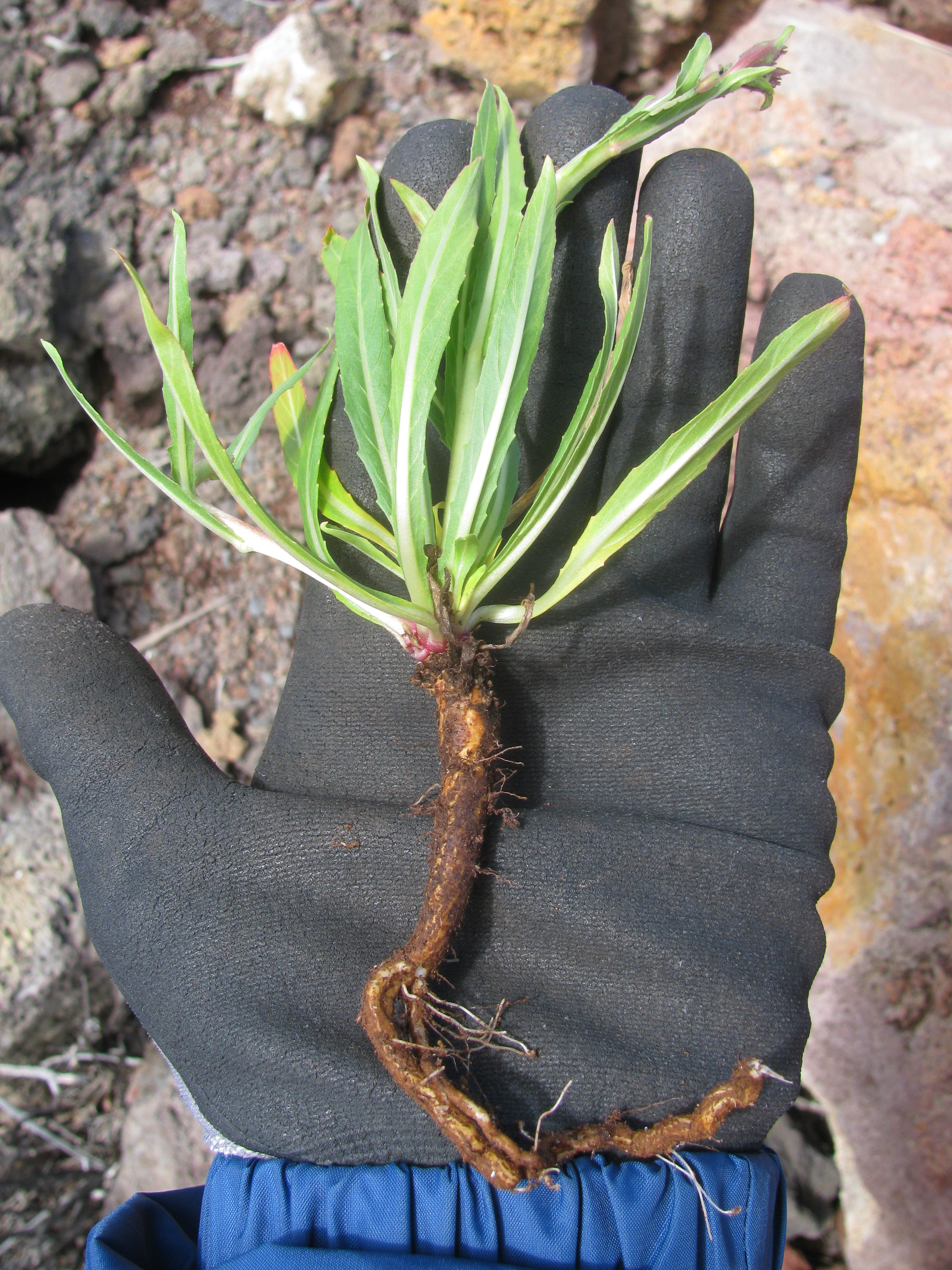
Uprooted

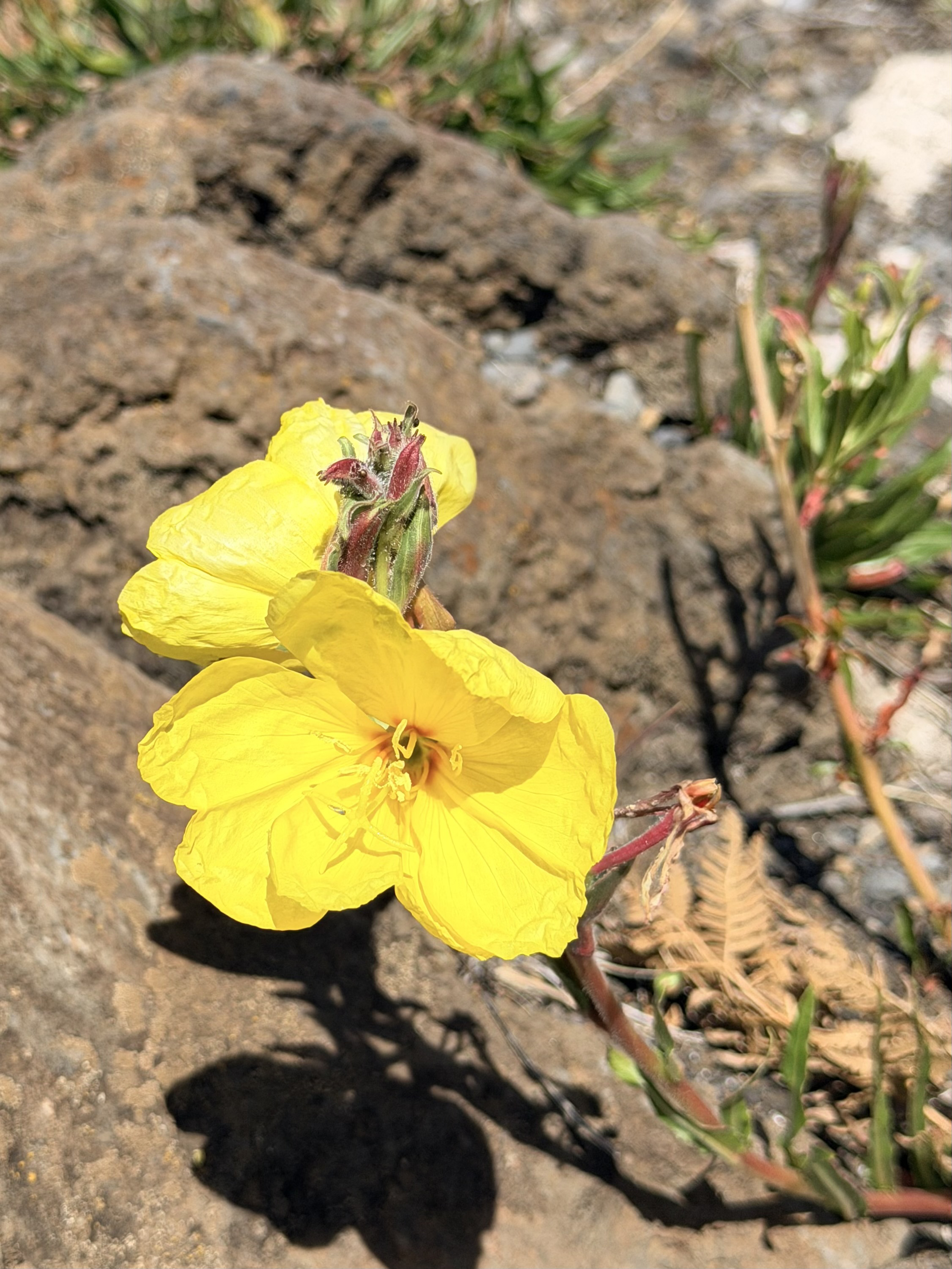
Haleakala Național Park (Maui)
