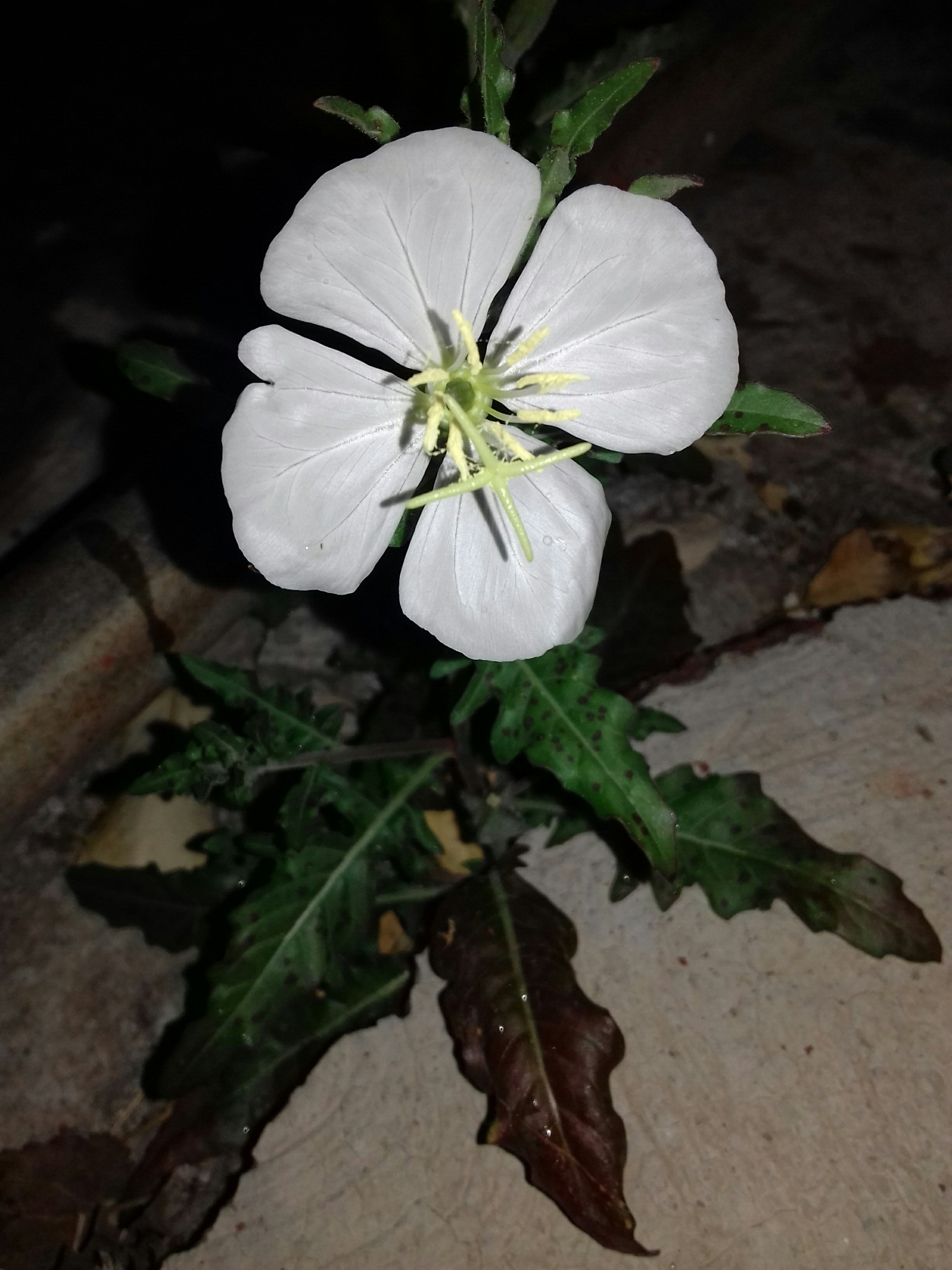

Scientific classification
- Kingdom: Plantae
- Clade: Tracheophytes
- Clade: Angiosperms
- Clade: Eudicots
- Clade: Rosids
- Order: Myrtales
- Family: Onagraceae
- Genus: Oenothera
- Species: O. tetraptera

Binomial name
- Oenothera tetraptera Cav.

= Oenothera tetraptera =

Species of flowering plant

Oenothera tetraptera, known as fourwing evening primrose, is a species of flowering plant in the evening primrose family (Onagraceae) native to the Americas. It has widely naturalized in other areas, including southern Africa, Europe, Asia, and Oceania.

Oenothera tetraptera was first formally named by Spanish botanist Antonio José Cavanilles in 1796. It is an annual or short-lived perennial herb growing 15–50 cm (0.5–1.6 ft) tall. The four-petaled, white flowers open around sunset. Each petal grows up to 3.8 cm (1.5 in) in length and the flowers change from white to pinkish purple as they age. The fruit is a hairy, obovoid capsule, 7–18 mm in length with wings 2–3 mm wide on the valves, for which the species was named.
