= Bajaj, Bhulath =

Bajaj
- Village
- Location in Punjab, India Bajaj (India)
- Coordinates: 31.534393°N 75.495322°E
- Country: India
- State: Punjab
- District: Kapurthala

Government
  - Type: Panchayati raj (India)
  - Body: Gram panchayat

Population (2011)
  - Total: 1,254
- Sex ratio 645/609♂/♀

Languages
  - Official: Punjabi
  - Other spoken: Hindi
- Time zone: UTC+5:30 (IST)
- PIN: 144622
- Telephone code: 01822
- ISO 3166 code: IN-PB
- Vehicle registration: PB-09
- Website: kapurthala.gov.in

Bajaj is a village in Bhulath Tehsil in Kapurthala district of Punjab State, India. It is located 8 kilometres (5.0 mi) from Bhulath, 30 kilometres (19 mi) away from the district headquarter Kapurthala. The village is administrated by a sarpanch, who is an elected representative.

== Demography ==
According to the report published by Census India in 2011, Bajaj has 260 houses with a total population of 1,254 persons, of which 645 are male and 609 females. The literacy rate of Bajaj is 80.02%, higher than the state average of 75.84%. The population of children in the age group 0–6 years is 113, which is 9.01% of the total population. The child sex ratio is approximately 915, higher than the state average of 846.

== Population data ==
Particulars	Total	Male	Female
Total no. of houses	260	-	-
Population	1,254	645	609
Child (0-6)	113	59	54
Scheduled Caste	413	205	208
Scheduled Tribe	0	0	0
Literacy	80.02 %	84.64 %	75.14 %
Total workers	343	307	36
Main workers	300	0	0
Marginal workers	43	34	9

As per census 2011, 343 people were engaged in work activities out of the total population of Bajaj which includes 307 males and 36 females. According to census survey report 2011, 87.46% workers (Employment or Earning more than 6 Months) describe their work as main work and 12.54% workers are involved in marginal activity providing livelihood for less than six months.

== Caste ==
Scheduled Castes (SC) constitute 32.93% of the total population; there is no Scheduled Tribe (ST) population.

== List of nearby cities ==
- Bhulath
- Kapurthala
- Phagwara
- Sultanpur Lodhi

== Air travel connectivity ==
The closest international airport to the village is Sri Guru Ram Dass Jee International Airport.
