= Bagrian, Bhulath =

Bagrian
- Village
- Location in Punjab, India Bagrian (India)
- Coordinates: 31.147130°N 75.341218°E
- Country: India
- State: Punjab
- District: Kapurthala

Government
  - Type: Panchayati raj (India)
  - Body: Gram panchayat

Population (2011)
  - Total: 1,205
- Sex ratio 600/605♂/♀

Languages
  - Official: Punjabi
  - Other spoken: Hindi
- Time zone: UTC+5:30 (IST)
- PIN: 144622
- Telephone code: 01822
- ISO 3166 code: IN-PB
- Vehicle registration: PB-09
- Website: kapurthala.gov.in

Bagrian is a village in Bhulath Tehsil in Kapurthala district of Punjab State, India. It is located 4 kilometres (2.5 mi) from Bhulath, 28 kilometres (17 mi) away from district headquarter Kapurthala. The village is administrated by a Sarpanch, who is an elected representative.

== Demography ==
According to the report published by Census India in 2011, Bagrian has 240 houses with the total population of 1,205 persons of which 600 are male and 605 females. Literacy rate of Bagrian is 77.01%, higher than the state average of 75.84%. The population of children in the age group 0–6 years is 109 which is 9.05% of the total population. Child sex ratio is approximately 535, lower than the state average of 846.

== Population data ==
Particulars	Total	Male	Female
Total No. of Houses	240	-	-
Population	1,205	600	605
Child (0–6)	109	71	38
Schedule Caste	366	184	182
Schedule Tribe	0	0	0
Literacy	77.01 %	78.45 %	75.66 %
Total Workers	332	291	41
Main Worker	308	0	0
Marginal Worker	24	19	5

As per census 2011, 332 people were engaged in work activities out of the total population of Bagrian which includes 291 males and 41 females. According to census survey report 2011, 92.77% workers (Employment or Earning more than 6 Months) describe their work as main work and 7.23% workers are involved in Marginal activity providing livelihood for less than 6 months.

== Caste ==
The village has schedule caste (SC) constitutes 30.37% of total population of the village and it doesn't have any Schedule Tribe (ST) population.

== List of cities near the village ==
- Bhulath
- Kapurthala
- Phagwara
- Sultanpur Lodhi

== Air travel connectivity ==
The closest International airport to the village is Sri Guru Ram Dass Jee International Airport.
