= List of submarines of Italy =

This is a list of submarines that have served the Italian Navy.

- Delfino
- Glauco class
  - Glauco
  - Narvalo
  - Otaria
  - Squalo
  - Tricheco
- Foca
- Medusa class
  - Medusa
  - Argo
  - Fisalia
  - Jalea
  - Jantina
  - Salpa
  - Velella
  - Zoea
- Atropo
- Nautilus class
  - Nautilus
  - Nereide
- Pullino class
  - Giacinto Pullino
  - Galileo Ferraris
- Alfa class - midget submarines
  - Alfa
  - Beta
- Argonauta - ordered as Svyatoy Georgi for the Imperial Russian Navy
- Balilla - ordered as SM U-42 for the Imperial German Navy
- Former British S class
  - S1 - former HMS S1
  - S2 - former HMS S2
  - S3 - former HMS S3
- A class - midget submarines
  - A1
  - A2
  - A3
  - A4
  - A5
  - A6
- Former British W class
  - W1 - former HMS W1
  - W2 - former HMS W2
  - W3 - former HMS W3
  - W4 - former HMS W4
- X1 - former German SM UC-12
- B class - midget submarines
  - B1
  - B2
  - B3
- Pacinotti class
  - Pacinotti
  - Guglielmotti
- F class
  - F1
  - F2
  - F3
  - F4
  - F5
  - F6
  - F7
  - F8
  - F9
  - F10
  - F11
  - F12
  - F13
  - F14
  - F15
  - F16
  - F17
  - F18
  - F19
  - F20
  - F21
- N class
  - N1
  - N2
  - N3
  - N4
  - N5
  - N6
- H class
  - H1
  - H2
  - H3
  - H4
  - H5
  - H6
  - H7
  - H8
- X2 class
  - X2
  - X3
- Micca class
  - Pietro Micca
  - Angelo Emo
  - Luigi Galvani
  - Lorenzo Marcello
  - Lazzaro Mocenigo
  - Torricelli
- Barbarigo class
  - Andrea Provana
  - Agostino Barbarigo
  - Giacomo Nani
  - Sebastiano Veniero
- Mameli class
  - Pier Capponi
  - Giovanni da Procida
  - Goffredo Mameli - former Masaniello
  - Tito Speri
- Balilla class
  - Antonio Sciesa
  - Balilla
  - Domenico Millelire
  - Enrico Toti
- Pisani class
  - Giovanni Bausan
  - Marcantonio Colonna
  - Des Geneys
  - Vettor Pisani
- Bandiera class
  - Fratelli Bandiera
  - Luciano Manara
  - Ciro Menotti
  - Santorre Santarosa
- Ettore Fieramosca
- Bragadin class
  - Marcantonio Bragadin
  - Filippo Corridoni
- Squalo class
  - Squalo
  - Delfino
  - Narvalo
  - Tricheco
- Settembrini class
  - Luigi Settembrini
  - Ruggiero Settimo
- Argonauta class
  - Argonauta
  - Fisalia
  - Jalea
  - Jantina
  - Medusa
  - Salpa
  - Serpente - former Nautilus
- Sirena class
  - Ametista
  - Anfitrite
  - Diamante
  - Galatea
  - Naiade
  - Nereide
  - Ondina
  - Rubino
  - Sirena
  - Smeraldo
  - Topazio
  - Zaffiro
- Archimede class
  - Archimede
  - Evangelista Torricelli
  - Galileo Ferraris
  - Galileo Galilei
- Glauco class
  - Glauco
  - Otaria
- Pietro Micca
- Calvi class
  - Pietro Calvi
  - Giuseppe Finzi
  - Enrico Tazzoli
- Argo class
  - Argo
  - Velella
- Perla class
  - Ambra
  - Berillo
  - Corallo
  - Diaspro
  - Gemma
  - Iride
  - Malachite
  - Onice
  - Perla
  - Turchese
- Adua class
  - Adua
  - Alagi
  - Aradam
  - Ascianghi
  - Axum
  - Beilul
  - Dagabur
  - Dessiè
  - Durbo
  - Gondar
  - Lafolè
  - Macallé
  - Neghelli
  - Scirè
  - Tembien
  - Uarsciek
  - Uebi Scebeli
- Foca class
  - Foca
  - Atropo
  - Zoea
- CA class - midget submarines
  - Type 1:
    - CA1
    - CA2
  - Type 2:
    - CA3
    - CA4
- Marcello class
  - Marcello
  - Dandolo
  - Veniero
  - Provana
  - Mocenigo
  - Nani
  - Barbarigo
  - Emo
  - Morosini
  - Comandante Cappellini
  - Comandante Faà di Bruno
- Brin class
  - Brin
  - Galvani
  - Guglielmotti
  - Archimede
  - Torricelli
- Liuzzi class
  - Console Generale Liuzzi
  - Alpino Bagnolini
  - Capitano Tarantini
  - Reginaldo Giuliani
- Marconi class
  - Alessandro Malaspina
  - Leonardo da Vinci
  - Luigi Torelli
  - Maggiore Baracca
  - Michele Bianchi
  - Guglielmo Marconi
- Cagni class
  - Ammiraglio Cagni
  - Ammiraglio Caracciolo
  - Ammiraglio Millo
  - Ammiraglio Saint-Bon
- Acciaio class
  - Acciaio
  - Alabastro
  - Argento
  - Asteria
  - Avorio
  - Bronzo
  - Cobalto
  - Giada
  - Granito
  - Nichelio
  - Platino
  - Porfido
  - Volframio
- CM class - midget submarines
  - CM1
  - CM2
- Flutto class or Tritone class
  - Type 1:
    - Tritone
    - Gorgo
    - Flutto
    - Marea
    - Vortice
    - Nautilo
    - Murena
    - Grongo
    - Sparide
    - Spigola
    - Cernia
    - Dentice
  - Type 2:
    - Alluminio
    - Amianto
    - Antimonio
    - Bario
    - Cadmio
    - Cromo
    - Ferro
    - Fosforo
    - Iridio
    - Litio
    - Magnesio
    - Manganese
    - Mercurio
    - Oro
    - Ottone
    - Piombo
    - Potassio
    - Rame
    - Rutenio
    - Silicio
    - Sodio
    - Vanadio
    - Zinco
    - Zolfo
- R class or Romolo class
  - Remo
  - Romolo
  - R 3 - R 12 - scuttled incomplete and scrapped after the war
- CB class - midget submarines
  - CB1
  - CB2
  - CB3
  - CB4
  - CB5
  - CB6
  - CB7
  - CB8
  - CB9
  - CB10
  - CB11
  - CB12
  - CB13
  - CB14
  - CB15
  - CB16
  - CB17
  - CB18
  - CB19
  - CB20
  - CB21
  - CB22
- Former US Gato class
  - Leonardo da Vinci - former USS Dace (SS-247)
  - Enrico Tazzoli - former USS Barb (SS-220)
- Former US Balao class
  - Alfredo Cappellini - former USS Capitaine (SS-336)
  - Evangelista Torricelli - former USS Lizardfish (SS-373)
  - Francesco Morosini - former USS Besugo (SS-321)
- Former US Tench class
  - Primo Longobardo - former USS Pickerel (SS-524)
  - Gianfranco Gazzana Priaroggia - former USS Volador (SS-490)
- Former US Tang class
  - Livio Piomarta - former USS Trigger (SS-564)
  - Romeo Romei - former USS Harder (SS-568)
- Toti class
  - Attilio Bagnolini
  - Enrico Toti
  - Enrico Dandolo
  - Lazzaro Mocenigo
- Sauro class
  - Nazario Sauro type
    - Nazario Sauro
    - Carlo Fecia di Cossato
    - Leonardo da Vinci
    - Guglielmo Marconi
  - Salvatore Pelosi type
    - Salvatore Pelosi
    - Giuliano Prini
  - Primo Longobardo type
    - Primo Longobardo
    - Gianfranco Gazzana Priaroggia
- Todaro class or Type 212
  - Salvatore Todaro
  - Scirè
  - Pietro Venuti
  - Romeo Romei

== See also ==
- List of submarines of the Second World War
- Italian submarines of World War II
