= List of ship commissionings in 1917 =

The list of ship commissionings in 1917 is a chronological list of ships commissioned in 1917. In cases where no official commissioning ceremony was held, the date of service entry may be used instead.

| Date | Operator | Ship | Class and type | Notes |
|---|---|---|---|---|
| January 18 | Regia Marina | F4 | F-class submarine | |
| January 24 | United States Navy | Allen | Sampson-class destroyer | |
| January (unknown date) | Royal Navy | Glorious | Courageous-class battlecruiser | Converted to an aircraft carrier |
| February 2 | Regia Marina | F8 | F-class submarine | |
| February 8 | Royal Netherlands Navy | Z 5 | Z 5-class torpedo boat | |
| February 8 | Royal Netherlands Navy | Z 6 | Z 5-class torpedo boat | |
| February 19 | Royal Navy | Skate | R-class destroyer | |
| February 26 | Regia Marina | F12 | F-class submarine | |
| February (unknown date) | Imperial German Navy | Nürnberg | Königsberg-class cruiser | |
| March 14 | Imperial German Navy | Baden | Bayern-class battleship | |
| March 18 | Regia Marina | F13 | F-class submarine | |
| March 19 | Regia Marina | F7 | F-class submarine | |
| April 9 | United States Navy | Arawan II | Section patrol craft | |
| April 9 | United States Navy | Shaw | Sampson-class destroyer | |
| April 18 | United States Navy | Actus | Section patrol craft | |
| April 24 | Royal Navy | Anzac | Parker-class destroyer leader | Transferred to Royal Australian Navy in 1919 |
| April 28 | Brazilian Navy | Ceará | Submarine support ship | |
| April 30 | Regia Marina | F16 | F-class submarine | |
| May 1 | United States Navy | Cyclops | Collier | |
| May 1 | Regia Marina | F6 | F-class submarine | |
| May 5 | United States Navy | Arvilla | Section patrol craft | |
| May 5 | Royal Netherlands Navy | O 8 | H-class submarine | Ex-HMS H6 |
| May 10 | United States Navy | Abalone | Section patrol craft | |
| May 10 | Imperial German Navy | Hindenburg | Derfflinger-class battlecruiser | |
| May 12 | United States Navy | Althea | Section patrol craft | |
| May 17 | United States Navy | Amagansett | Minesweeper | |
| May 18 | United States Navy | Almax II | Section patrol craft | |
| May 19 | United States Navy | Alpha | Section patrol craft | |
| May 27 | United States Navy | Abarenda | collier | Under command of Lt. Commander Harry M. Bostwick, USNRF |
| May 30 | United States Navy | Alacrity | Section patrol craft | |
| May 31 | United States Navy | Akbar | Section patrol craft | |
| June 5 | United States Navy | Aloha | Section patrol craft | |
| June 5 | United States Navy | Aphrodite | Section patrol craft | |
| June 6 | United States Navy | Advance | Section patrol craft | Transferred to United States Coast Guard in 1919 |
| June 9 | United States Navy | Arcady | Section patrol craft | |
| June 25 | United States Navy | Arroyo | Section patrol craft | |
| June 26 | Royal Navy | Furious | Courageous-class battlecruiser | Converted to an aircraft carrier |
| June 27 | United States Navy | Astrea | Section patrol craft | |
| July 6 | United States Navy | Helianthus | Section patrol craft | Transferred to United States Coast and Geodetic Survey in 1919 |
| July 7 | United States Navy | Apache | Section patrol craft | Transferred to United States Coast Guard in 1919 |
| July 10 | United States Navy | Vergana | Section patrol craft | |
| July 27 | United States Navy | Advance | Section patrol craft | |
| July 27 | Regia Marina | F18 | F-class submarine | |
| July 28 | United States Navy | Alcedo | Section patrol craft | |
| July 28 | United States Navy | Avis | Section patrol craft | |
| August 5 | Regia Marina | F13 | F-class submarine | |
| August 10 | United States Navy | Albatross | Section patrol craft | |
| August 11 | United States Navy | Ameera | Section patrol craft | |
| August 13 | Regia Marina | F15 | F-class submarine | |
| August 15 | United States Navy | Ardent | Section patrol craft / minesweeper | |
| August 16 | United States Navy | Annabelle | Section patrol craft | |
| August 17 | United States Navy | Anado | Section patrol craft | |
| August 17 | Regia Marina | F17 | F-class submarine | |
| August 18 | United States Navy | Anderton | Section patrol craft / minesweeper | |
| August 18 | United States Navy | Arcturus | Section patrol craft | |
| August 25 | Spanish Navy | A-3 | A-class submarine | |
| August 25 | Spanish Navy | Cadarso | Bustamante-class destroyer | |
| August 25 | Spanish Navy | Cosme García | A-class submarine | |
| August 25 | Spanish Navy | Narcíso Monturiol | A-class submarine | |
| August 30 | United States Navy | L-8 | L-class submarine | |
| September 1 | Royal Navy | Ramillies | Revenge-class battleship | |
| September 26 | United States Navy | N-1 | N-class submarine | |
| September 26 | United States Navy | N-2 | N-class submarine | |
| September 26 | United States Navy | N-3 | N-class submarine | |
| September 27 | United States Navy | Atlantis | Section patrol craft | |
| October 1 | United States Navy | Aurore II | Section patrol craft | |
| October 5 | United States Navy | Anton Dohrn | Section patrol craft | |
| October 15 | United States Navy | Manley | Caldwell-class destroyer | |
| October 17 | United States Navy | Artemis | Section patrol craft | |
| October 18 | United States Navy | Acoma | Section patrol craft | |
| October 20 | Portuguese Navy | Foca | Foca-class submarine | |
| October 20 | Portuguese Navy | Golfinho | Foca-class submarine | |
| October 20 | Portuguese Navy | Hidra | Foca-class submarine | |
| October 31 | United States Navy | Tanguingui | Section patrol craft | Returned to original owner on April 21, 1919 |
| November 1 | United States Navy | Arval | Section patrol craft | |
| November 2 | United States Navy | Aramis | Section patrol craft | |
| November 5 | United States Navy | Audwin | Section patrol craft | Transferred to United States Coast and Geodetic Survey 1919 |
| December 1 | United States Navy | Caldwell | Caldwell-class destroyer | |
| December 7 | United States Navy | L-6 | L-class submarine | |
| December 7 | United States Navy | L-7 | L-class submarine | |
| December 17 | United States Navy | Adelante | Section patrol craft | |
| December 18 | United States Navy | Mississippi | New Mexico-class battleship | |
| December 30 | United States Navy | A-1 | Section patrol craft | |
| unknown date | United States Navy | Albacore | Section patrol craft | |
