= List of ship decommissionings in 1929 =

The list of ship decommissionings in 1929 is a chronological list of ships decommissioned in 1929. In cases where no official decommissioning ceremony was held, the date of withdrawal from service may be used instead. For ships lost at sea, see list of shipwrecks in 1929 instead.

Date	Operator	Ship	Class and type	Fate and other notes	Ref
1 February	Regia Marina	F2	F-class submarine	Scrapped	
1 February	Regia Marina	F7	F-class submarine	Scrapped	
28 May	Regia Marina	F15	F-class submarine	Scrapped	
20 July	Regia Marina	F5	F-class submarine	Scrapped	
20 July	Regia Marina	F12	F-class submarine	Scrapped	
1 November	Regia Marina	F17	F-class submarine	Scrapped	
1 November	Regia Marina	F18	F-class submarine	Scrapped	
