= List of ship commissionings in 1916 =

The list of ship commissionings in 1916 is a chronological list of ships commissioned in 1916. In cases where no official commissioning ceremony was held, the date of service entry may be used instead.

	Operator	Ship	Flag	Class and type	Pennant	Other notes
21 January	United States Navy	Conyngham		Tucker-class destroyer	DD-58	
1 February	Royal Navy	Malaya		Queen Elizabeth-class battleship		
1 February	Royal Navy	Revenge		Revenge-class battleship		
10 February	French Navy	Bretagne		Bretagne-class battleship		
10 February	United States Navy	Jacob Jones		Tucker-class destroyer	DD-61	
19 February	Royal Navy	Valiant		Queen Elizabeth-class battleship		
1 March	French Navy	Provence		Bretagne-class battleship		
10 March	French Navy	Lorraine		Bretagne-class battleship		
11 March	United States Navy	Nevada		Nevada-class battleship	BB-36	
11 April	United States Navy	Tucker		Tucker-class destroyer	DD-57	
17 April	United States Navy	Porter		Tucker-class destroyer	DD-59	
18 April	Royal Navy	Royal Sovereign		Revenge-class battleship	05	
1 May	Royal Navy	Royal Oak		Revenge-class battleship	08	
2 May	United States Navy	Oklahoma		Nevada-class battleship	BB-37	
12 May	United States Navy	Wainwright		Tucker-class destroyer	DD-62	
12 June	United States Navy	Pennsylvania		Pennsylvania-class battleship	BB-38	
27 June	United States Navy	Sampson		Sampson-class destroyer	DD-63	
15 July	Imperial German Navy	Bayern		Bayern-class battleship		
16 August	Spanish Navy	Villaamil		Bustamante-class destroyer	V	
18 August	Royal Navy	Repulse		Renown-class battlecruiser		
27 August	United States Navy	Rowan		Sampson-class destroyer	DD-64	
8 September	Regia Marina	F2		F-class submarine	F2	
8 September	Royal Netherlands Navy	Z 7		Z 5-class torpedo boat	Z 7	
20 September	Royal Navy	Renown		Renown-class battlecruiser		
22 September	Royal Netherlands Navy	Z 8		Z 5-class torpedo boat	Z 8	
5 October	United States Navy	Davis		Sampson-class destroyer	DD-65	
17 October	United States Navy	Arizona		Pennsylvania-class battleship	BB-39	
19 October	Regia Marina	F3		F-class submarine	F3	
20 October	Regia Marina	F1		F-class submarine	F1	
21 October	Royal Australian Navy	Brisbane		Town-class cruiser		
4 November	Royal Navy	Courageous		Courageous-class battlecruiser	50	later converted to aircraft carrier
10 November	United States Navy	Wilkes		Sampson-class destroyer	DD-67	
26 November	Regia Marina	F5		F-class submarine	F5	
5 December	Royal Netherlands Navy	O 6		Unique submarine	O 6	
23 December	Royal Netherlands Navy	O 7		Unique submarine	O 7	
29 December	Regia Marina	F9		F-class submarine	F9	
29 December	Regia Marina	F10		F-class submarine	F10	
29 December	Regia Marina	F11		F-class submarine	F11	
30 December	Royal Navy	Resolution		Revenge-class battleship	09	
