= List of ship commissionings in 1918 =

The list of ship commissionings in 1918 is a chronological list of ships commissioned in 1918. In cases where no official commissioning ceremony was held, the date of service entry may be used instead.

Date	Operator	Ship	Pennant	Class and type	Notes
March 25	United States Navy	A. G. Prentiss	ID-2313	Tugboat	civilian tug delivered to Navy service under charter
April 6	United States Navy	Fairfax	Destroyer No. 93	Wickes-class destroyer	
April 16	United States Navy	Akela	SP-1793	Section patrol craft	
April 16	United States Navy	Little	Destroyer No. 79	Wickes-class destroyer	
April 18	United States Navy	Arroyo	SP-197	Section patrol craft	
April 24	Regia Marina	F19	F19	F-class submarine	
April 26	United States Navy	Kimberly	Destroyer No. 80	Wickes-class destroyer	
May 15	United States Navy	Sigourney	Destroyer No. 81	Wickes-class destroyer	
May 20	United States Navy	New Mexico	BB-40	New Mexico-class battleship	
May 24	United States Navy	Stevens	Destroyer No. 86	Wickes-class destroyer	
May 29	United States Navy	Avenger	SP-2646	Section patrol craft	
June 1	United States Navy	Gregory	Destroyer No. 82	Wickes-class destroyer	
June 1	United States Navy	Taylor	Destroyer No. 94	Wickes-class destroyer	
June 7	Regia Marina	F20	F20	F-class submarine	
June 8	United States Navy	Israel	Destroyer No. 98	Wickes-class destroyer	
June 13	United States Navy	Colhoun	Destroyer No. 85	Wickes-class destroyer	
June 24	United States Navy	Rathburne	Destroyer No. 113	Wickes-class destroyer	
June 29	United States Navy	Luce	Destroyer No. 99	Wickes-class destroyer	
July 1	United States Navy	Dyer	Destroyer No. 84	Wickes-class destroyer	
July 2	United States Navy	Stringham	Destroyer No. 83	Wickes-class destroyer	
July 4	United States Navy	Maury	Destroyer No. 100	Wickes-class destroyer	
July 17	Imperial German Navy	Oswald	FS III	Converted merchant type seaplane carrier	
July 20	United States Navy	Talbot	Destroyer No. 114	Wickes-class destroyer	
July 21	United States Navy	Lansdale	Destroyer No. 101	Wickes-class destroyer	
July 26	United States Navy	Montgomery	Destroyer No. 121	Wickes-class destroyer	
July 31	United States Navy	Bell	Destroyer No. 95	Wickes-class destroyer	
July 31	United States Navy	Wickes	Destroyer No. 75	Wickes-class destroyer	
August 4	United States Navy	Mahan	Destroyer No. 102	Wickes-class destroyer	
August 8	United States Navy	Waters	Destroyer No. 115	Wickes-class destroyer	
August 14	United States Navy	Arabia	ID-3434	Section patrol craft	
August 16	United States Navy	Stribling	Destroyer No. 96	Wickes-class destroyer	
August 18	United States Navy	Lamberton	Destroyer No. 119	Wickes-class destroyer	
August 21	United States Navy	Murray	Destroyer No. 97	Wickes-class destroyer	
August 24	United States Navy	Philip	Destroyer No. 76	Wickes-class destroyer	
August 31	Regia Marina	F21	F21	F-class submarine	
September 7	United States Navy	McKee	Destroyer No. 87	Wickes-class destroyer	
September 9	United States Navy	Dent	Destroyer No. 116	Wickes-class destroyer	
September 16	United States Navy	Dorsey	Destroyer No. 117	Wickes-class destroyer	
September 20	United States Navy	Schley	Destroyer No. 103	Wickes-class destroyer	
September 30	United States Navy	Radford	Destroyer No. 120	Wickes-class destroyer	
September 30	United States Navy	Woolsey	Destroyer No. 77	Wickes-class destroyer	
October 1	Royal Netherlands Navy	M 3	M 3	M-class minesweeper	
October 1	Royal Netherlands Navy	M 4	M 4	M-class minesweeper	
October 2	United States Navy	Lea	Destroyer No. 118	Wickes-class destroyer	
October 11	United States Navy	Evans	Destroyer No. 78	Wickes-class destroyer	
October 19	United States Navy	Robinson	Destroyer No. 88	Wickes-class destroyer	
October 23	United States Navy	Breese	Destroyer No. 122	Wickes-class destroyer	
October 31	Royal Netherlands Navy	M 1	M 1	M-class minesweeper	
November 11	United States Navy	Champlin	Destroyer No. 104	Wickes-class destroyer	
November 14	United States Navy	Ringgold	Destroyer No. 89	Wickes-class destroyer	
November 25	United States Navy	Mugford	Destroyer No. 105	Wickes-class destroyer	
November 29	United States Navy	Gamble	Destroyer No. 123	Wickes-class destroyer	
December 3	Royal Netherlands Navy	M 2	M 2	M-class minesweeper	
December 12	United States Navy	Chew	Destroyer No. 106	Wickes-class destroyer	
December 23	United States Navy	Ludlow	Destroyer No. 112	Wickes-class destroyer	
unknown date	United States Navy	Ahdeek	SP-2589	Section patrol craft	Loaned to Culver Naval School 1919
