= NRP Foca (F) =

Portuguese Navy submarine of 1917–1935

History

Italy
- Name: F19
- Builder: FIAT-San Giorgio, La Spezia, Italy
- Yard number: 137
- Laid down: 3 June 1915
- Fate: Sold to Portugal early 1916

History

Portugal
- Acquired: December 1915 or early 1916
- Launched: 17 March or 2 April 1916
- Renamed: Foca, August 1916
- Namesake: Seal, a type of pinniped
- Commissioned: 5 September or 20 October 1917
- Stricken: December 1935
- Identification: Pennant F
- Fate: Scrapped

General characteristics
- Class & type: F-class submarine
- Displacement: 262 long tons (266 t) (surfaced); 319 long tons (324 t) (submerged)
- Length: 45.6 m (149 ft 7 in) (overall); 45.1 m (148 ft 0 in) (between perpendiculars)
- Beam: 4.2 m (13 ft 9 in)
- Draught: 3.1 m (10 ft 2 in)
- Propulsion: 2 × 670 bhp (500 kW) Fiat diesel engines; 2 × 500 hp (373 kW) Savigliano electric motors; 2 x shafts; 15 tons diesel fuel
- Speed: 12.5 knots (23.2 km/h; 14.4 mph) (surfaced); 8.2 knots (15.2 km/h; 9.4 mph) (submerged)
- Range: 1,600 nmi (3,000 km; 1,800 mi) at 8.5 knots (15.7 km/h; 9.8 mph) (surfaced); 80 nmi (150 km; 92 mi) at 4 knots (7.4 km/h; 4.6 mph) (submerged)
- Test depth: 45 metres (148 feet)
- Complement: 26 (2 officers, 24 men)
- Armament: 2 × 450 mm (17.7 in) torpedo tubes (2 bow); 4 x torpedoes; 1 × 76 mm (3 in) deck gun
- Notes: SOURCE:

Foca was the lead ship of the Portuguese Navy's Foca-class submarines. She was in commission from 1917 to 1935 and took part in World War I.

== Construction and commissioning ==
The Portuguese Navy commissioned its first submarine, Espadarte, in 1913. Portugal considered the creation of a full submarine squadron by ordering four submarines of an improved design, with one constructed abroad and three in Portugal, but later dropped these plans. World War I broke out in the summer of 1914, and although Portugal initially remained neutral, Portuguese concerns over the Portuguese Navy's capability to defend the Portuguese coast and the sea lanes between Portugal and its possessions in the Portuguese Empire grew. Amid increasing tensions between Portugal and Germany, Germany and Austria-Hungary declared war on Portugal in March 1916. In either December 1915 or early 1916, according to different sources, the Portuguese Navy ordered three submarines from the Italian firm FIAT-San Giorgio in early 1916.

FIAT-San Giorgio already was building F-class submarines for the Italian Regia Marina (Royal Navy), and three F-class submarines already under construction for the Regia Marina — F19, F20, and F21 — were sold to Portugal to fulfill the Portuguese order. To replace them, the Regia Marina ordered three additional submarines from FIAT-San Giorgio and also designated them F19, F20, and F21, as which they later entered service in the Regia Marina.

FIAT-San Giorgio laid down the submarine that became Foca as F19 with the yard number 137 on 3 June 1915, several months before her sale to Portugal. Sources disagree on the date she was launched, claiming both that it was on 17 March and that it was on 2 April 1916. The Portuguese minister in Rome, Eusébio Leão, attended the launch ceremony. In August 1916, the Portuguese Navy made public that in Portuguese service she would bear the name Foca (Portuguese for "seal," a type of pinniped). Upon her completion, Foca was commissioned on 5 September 1917, according to some sources, although others state that the commissioning was on 20 October 1917 and that the formal handover of Foca and her sister ships Golfinho and Hidra did not take place until 20 October. To symbolize the continuing expansion and development of the Portuguese submarine force, the silver inkwell used to sign the acceptance papers for Portugal's first submarine, Espadarte, was used again for the paperwork for the three Foca-class submarines, as the Portuguese Navy referred to them collectively.

== Service history ==
=== World War I ===
==== Delivery voyage ====
With Portugal a belligerent in World War I, the Portuguese Navy saw an urgent need for the three new submarines in Portuguese waters and decided they would have to make their delivery voyage to Lisbon during the winter of 1917–1918 despite the high likelihood of adverse weather during that time of year. The Portuguese Navy considered having the submarines make their voyage without an escort, but with Imperial German Navy submarines operating in the Mediterranean Sea during the Mediterranean U-boat campaign opted instead to assign an escort to them for the voyage and request escort support from the Italian Regia Marina, French Navy, and British Royal Navy. Portugal also considered a third possibility, that the Allies would agree to escort the Portuguese submarines only if Portugal agreed that the submarines would operate from a base of the Allies' choosing outside of Portugal, but ultimately the Allies agreed to provide escorts for a voyage all the way to Portugal.

To allow the submarines to avoid calling at ports in neutral Spain, where they would run a risk of internment for the remainder of the war, the Portuguese loaded extra fuel aboard them, taking up space that reduced their habitability for their crews. In case of encounters with German submarines during the voyage, the Portuguese also required their submarines to make the voyage ready for immediate diving, with their torpedo tubes flooded and their torpedoes set to run at a depth of 7 metres (23 feet); this required the submarines to leave external hatches open while underway, creating drag which reduced their speed. The submarines also had to reduce speed to maintain formation with the armed tug Patrão Lopes — the only ship the Portuguese Navy could spare — which had been tasked to act as an escort and support ship for them throughout their delivery voyage.

Patrão Lopes arrived at La Spezia on 8 December 1917 and loaded supplies and spare parts for the submarines. The Italian torpedo boat Condore arrived on 13 December with orders to escort the Portuguese vessels on the first leg of their voyage. The three submarines got underway at 04:00 on 15 December and moored at a buoy to await a rendezvous with Patrão Lopes and Condore. The five vessels then began the voyage, putting into port at Villefranche-sur-Mer, France, later in the day due to worsening weather. The submarines moored to a jetty there to await an opportunity to continue.

The submarines and Patrão Lopes, now escorted by the French Navy torpedo boats No. 369 and Borée, finally put back to sea on 22 December 1917, arriving eight hours later at Toulon, France. They remained there until 2 January 1918, when they attempted to begin the next leg of their voyage, now escorted by the French patrol vessel Elizabeth Marie, but bad weather forced them back into port. The three submarines, Patrão Lopes, and Elizabeth Marie set out again on 4 January and proceeded to Marseille, France, which they reached the same day.

The five vessels resumed their voyage on 15 January 1918, departing Marseille at 07:00 bound for Cette (now Sète), France. That same day, they witnessed the torpedoing of the Spanish steamer Buena Nova by an Imperial German Navy submarine. Buena Nova sank, and Elizabeth Marie rescued her survivors. Later on 15 January, the ships reached Cette, where Elizabeth Marie put Buena Nova′s survivors ashore.

After an overnight stay at Cette, the ships got back underway on 16 January 1918 bound for Oran in French Morocco, but severe weather forced them to take refuge at Port-Vendres, France. On 18 January they made another attempt to reach Oran, but returned to Port-Vendres because of the weather. They finally were able to continue their voyage on 24 January, departing Port-Vendres and proceeding under escort by the French patrol vessel Aily to Oran, which they visited from 26 to 29 January 1918. Still under escort by Aily, they next headed for Gibraltar, where they called from 30 January to 8 February. They anchored at Sesimbra, Portugal, on 9 February, and finally reached Lisbon on 10 February 1918 after an eight-stage, 57-day journey from La Spezia.

==== Operations ====
Prior to the arrival of Foca, Golfinho, and Hidra at Lisbon, Espadarte had been limited to experimental and training activities. The arrival of the three Foca-class submarines allowed them to join Espadarte in forming the Portuguese Navy's 1st Submarine Squadron, Portugal's first fully operational submarine force. Based at the Belém Dock in Lisbon's Belém district on the north bank of the Tagus, the squadron was assigned to antisubmarine patrols off Lisbon to defend the Tagus estuary from German submarines, which were targeting Allied ships off the Tagus during the Atlantic U-boat campaign of World War I.

Assigned an operating area described by one source as between the Berlengas and Sines and by another as between Cabo da Roca and Cape Espichel, the squadron began regular operations in June 1918, generally in the waters off Cascais. Although the submarines never sank a German submarine, the Portuguese Navy assessed that the Imperial German Navy's knowledge of their mere presence forced changes in German submarine operations, requiring German submarines to remain submerged during daylight hours to avoid the risk of attack by Portuguese submarines, reducing their field of vision and thus their ability to sight and attack Allied ships. In addition, the Portuguese submarines had a wireless telegraphy capability, allowing them to detect German wireless transmissions farther out to sea than shore-based surveillance stations could alone, giving the Allies wider insight into German naval operations in the area.

Each antisubmarine patrol typically lasted about three days. The submarines were escorted to and from their patrol areas by surface warships and operated submerged by day and on the surface at night while on patrol. They could employ recognition signals and bore recognition markings to avoid mistaken "friendly fire" attacks by Allied forces. However, Portuguese Navy doctrine in 1918 was to attack immediately any submarine Allied forces sighted under the assumption that it was an enemy vessel because of the difficulty of detecting and attacking it once it submerged. The Portuguese Navy directed its submarines to assume that Portuguese forces would treat them as enemy submarines while they were on patrol and placed the onus on them to evade mistaken attacks by friendly forces, using their ability to submerge and escape in an era when sensor technology for the detection of submerged submarines was primitive at best and entirely lacking aboard many ships.

World War I ended on 11 November 1918. That day finally brought an end to five months of intensive operations off the Tagus estuary by the Portuguese submarines.

=== 1919–1936 ===
In early 1919, the 1st Submarine Squadron began a regular program of coastal patrolling off the Tagus estuary, during which they made dives and conducted torpedo-firing drills. On 7–8 October 1924, the squadron conducted its first exercise involving all four submarines, a high-stakes event with President of Portugal Manuel Teixeira Gomes and Minister of the Navy Fernando Augusto Pereira da Silva looking on. The four submarines conducted a simulated coordinated attack against the moving gunboat Bengo in the eastern part of Cascais Bay, demonstrating to the Portuguese government the efficacy of a multi-submarine harbor defense.

By the mid-1920s, the aging Espadrate was in such poor condition that the Portuguese Navy kept her docked in harbor, placing additional operational pressure on the three Foca-class submarines. In July 1925, Portuguese Navy conducted its first major naval maneuvers since the end of World War I; the maneuvers took place in Lagos Bay and involved Foca, Golfinho, and Hidra along with surface warships and naval aviation forces. In August 1925, the submarines took part in an exercise with the Portuguese Navy's main battle force off Buarcos. In the summer of 1926, they conducted an exercise off Cascais, and in July 1928 they participated in maneuvers as part of the Joint Exercise Flotilla.

Espadarte was decommissioned in 1928, but Foca, Golfinho, and Hidra remained in service, carrying out an instruction and training program involving two weekly sorties into the waters off Cascais, Sesimbra, and Setúbal. They averaged eight submersion exercises per month. By the second half of the 1920s, however, they had operated for about a decade without major refits and faced a progressive deterioration of their batteries and other aging equipment, prompting the Portuguese Navy to place operational restrictions on them. From 1929 to 1932, they participated in the annual summer maneuvers, but only under controlled conditions in protected coastal waters. When the Portuguese Navy deployed to Madeira during the Madeira uprising of April 1931, the submarines' material condition forced them to remain behind in mainland Portugal.

The 1930 naval program of Minister of the Navy Contra-almirante (Counter Admiral) Luís Magalhães Correia included three new Delfim-class submarines as replacements for the Foca-class vessels. By 1932, the Portuguese Navy was keeping the three Foca-class submarines in a minimally operational status for the training of crews and to maintain an active command structure for the submarine force while awaiting the arrival of the new submarines. The three submarines gathered together for the last time on 5 October 1933 when they took part in a naval review in Cascais Bay to celebrate the 23rd anniversary of the establishment of the First Portuguese Republic and underwent an inspection by high-ranking government and naval officials as a final send-off for them.

The new Delfim-class submarines arrived from their construction yards in the United Kingdom in 1935 to form the 2nd Submarine Squadron. Foca was stricken from the navy list in December 1935. She subsequently was scrapped.
