= Italian submarine F16 =

Italian Navy submarine of 1917–1928

- F16 undergoing maintenance on a slipway at Ancona, Italy.

History

Italy
- Name: F16
- Builder: Odero, Sestri Ponente, Italy
- Laid down: 4 October 1915
- Launched: 19 March 1917
- Commissioned: 30 April 1917
- Decommissioned: 1 May 1928
- Stricken: 1 May 1928
- Identification: Pennant number F16
- Motto: Honni soit qui mal y pense ("Let him who thinks badly of us be ashamed")
- Fate: Scrapped

General characteristics
- Class & type: F-class submarine
- Displacement: 262 long tons (266 t) (surfaced); 319 long tons (324 t) (submerged)
- Length: 45.6 m (149 ft 7 in) (overall); 45.1 m (148 ft 0 in) (between perpendiculars)
- Beam: 4.2 m (13 ft 9 in)
- Draught: 3.1 m (10 ft 2 in)
- Propulsion: 2 × 670 bhp (500 kW) Fiat diesel engines; 2 × 500 hp (373 kW) Savigliano electric motors; 2 x shafts; 15 tons diesel fuel
- Speed: 12.5 knots (23.2 km/h; 14.4 mph) (surfaced); 8.2 knots (15.2 km/h; 9.4 mph) (submerged)
- Range: 1,600 nmi (3,000 km; 1,800 mi) at 8.5 knots (15.7 km/h; 9.8 mph) (surfaced); 80 nmi (150 km; 92 mi) at 4 knots (7.4 km/h; 4.6 mph) (submerged)
- Test depth: 45 metres (148 feet)
- Complement: 26 (2 officers, 24 men)
- Armament: 2 × 450 mm (17.7 in) torpedo tubes (2 bow); 4 x torpedoes; 1 × 76 mm (3 in) deck gun
- Notes: SOURCE:

F16 was an F-class submarine in commission in the Italian Regia Marina (Royal Navy) from 1917 to 1928. She took part in World War I, conducting antisubmarine patrols in the Mediterranean Sea during the Mediterranean U-boat campaign and seeing service in the Adriatic Campaign.

== Construction and commissioning ==
F16 was laid down by Cantieri navali Odero (Odero Shipyards) at Sestri Ponente, Italy, on 4 October 1915. She was launched on 19 March 1917 and commissioned on 30 April 1917.

== Service history ==
On 1 May 1917, F16 was assigned to the La Spezia Maritime Command. Under its control, she conducted antisubmarine patrols in the northern Tyrrhenian Sea during the Mediterranean U-boat campaign.

In September 1917, F16 was transferred to the Ancona Submarine Squadron to take part in the Adriatic Campaign of World War I. Before the war ended in November 1918, she conducted nine war patrols in the Adriatic Sea, without significant results.

From 1919 to 1923, F16 operated under the control of the Venice Maritime Command, deploying frequently to Pola. In November 1923 she was transferred to the Taranto Submarine Flotilla Command. She participated in annual attack and torpedo-firing drills and took part in the naval maneuvers of June 1927.

F16 was decommissioned and stricken from the navy list on 1 May 1928. She subsequently was scrapped.
