= Italian submarine F6 =

Italian Navy submarine of 1917–1935

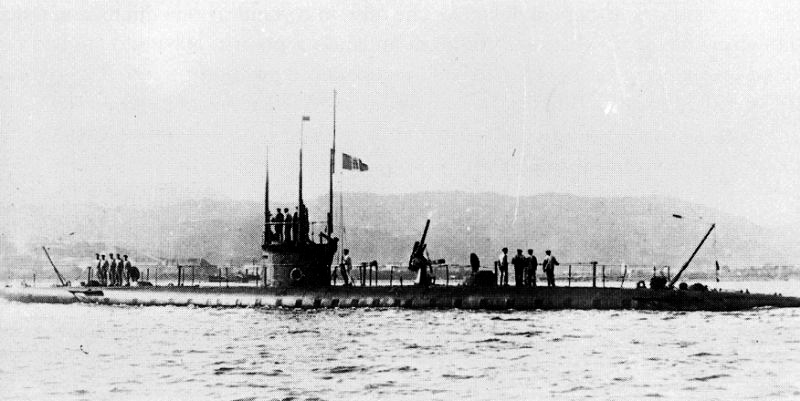

History

Italy
- Name: F6
- Builder: Orlando, Livorno, Italy
- Laid down: 16 June 1915
- Launched: 4 March 1917
- Commissioned: 1 May 1917
- Decommissioned: 1 August 1935
- Identification: Pennant number F6
- Motto: Feros submergeam et empios ("I will submerge the cruel and the wicked")
- Fate: Scrapped

General characteristics
- Class & type: F-class submarine
- Displacement: 262 long tons (266 t) (surfaced); 319 long tons (324 t) (submerged)
- Length: 45.6 m (149 ft 7 in) (overall); 45.1 m (148 ft 0 in) (between perpendiculars)
- Beam: 4.2 m (13 ft 9 in)
- Draught: 3.1 m (10 ft 2 in)
- Propulsion: 2 × 670 bhp (500 kW) Fiat diesel engines; 2 × 500 hp (373 kW) Savigliano electric motors; 2 x shafts; 15 tons diesel fuel
- Speed: 12.5 knots (23.2 km/h; 14.4 mph) (surfaced); 8.2 knots (15.2 km/h; 9.4 mph) (submerged)
- Range: 1,600 nmi (3,000 km; 1,800 mi) at 8.5 knots (15.7 km/h; 9.8 mph) (surfaced); 80 nmi (150 km; 92 mi) at 4 knots (7.4 km/h; 4.6 mph) (submerged)
- Test depth: 45 metres (148 feet)
- Complement: 26 (2 officers, 24 men)
- Armament: 2 × 450 mm (17.7 in) torpedo tubes (2 bow); 4 x torpedoes; 1 × 76 mm (3 in) deck gun
- Notes: SOURCE:

F6 was an F-class submarine in commission in the Italian Regia Marina (Royal Navy) from 1917 to 1935. She took part in World War I, seeing service in the Mediterranean Sea and in the Adriatic Campaign.

== Construction and commissioning ==
F6 was laid down by Cantiere navale fratelli Orlando (Orlando Brothers Shipyard) in Livorno (Leghorn), Italy, on 16 June 1915. She was launched on 4 March 1917 and commissioned on 1 May 1917.

== Service history ==
After completing her workups, F6 was deemed operationally ready on 20 June 1917. She was assigned to the La Spezia Maritime Command for operations in the Mediterranean Sea during the Mediterranean U-boat campaign of World War I.

In September 1917, F6 was assigned to the Venice Submarine Command. Based at Ancona, she subsequently took part in the Adriatic Campaign. Before World War I ended in November 1918, she conducted 30 war patrols in the northern Adriatic Sea, but without any significant results.

After the end of World War I, F6 continued to operate in the northern Adriatic Sea until May 1921. In October 1921 she was transferred to Taranto. She subsequently took part in naval maneuvers, attack exercises, and torpedo-firing drills, including combined maneuvers and exercises with surface warships.

F6 was decommissioned on 1 August 1935. She subquently was scrapped.
