= Italian submarine F4 =

Italian Navy submarine of 1917–1935

- F4 departing a port on the Adriatic Sea.

History

Italy
- Name: F4
- Builder: Orlando, Livorno, Italy
- Laid down: 8 June 1915
- Launched: 19 November 1916
- Commissioned: 18 January 1917
- Decommissioned: 1 September 1919
- Identification: Pennant number F4
- Fate: Scrapped

General characteristics
- Class & type: F-class submarine
- Displacement: 262 long tons (266 t) (surfaced); 319 long tons (324 t) (submerged)
- Length: 45.6 m (149 ft 7 in) (overall); 45.1 m (148 ft 0 in) (between perpendiculars)
- Beam: 4.2 m (13 ft 9 in)
- Draught: 3.1 m (10 ft 2 in)
- Propulsion: 2 × 670 bhp (500 kW) Fiat diesel engines; 2 × 500 hp (373 kW) Savigliano electric motors; 2 x shafts; 15 tons diesel fuel
- Speed: 12.5 knots (23.2 km/h; 14.4 mph) (surfaced); 8.2 knots (15.2 km/h; 9.4 mph) (submerged)
- Range: 1,600 nmi (3,000 km; 1,800 mi) at 8.5 knots (15.7 km/h; 9.8 mph) (surfaced); 80 nmi (150 km; 92 mi) at 4 knots (7.4 km/h; 4.6 mph) (submerged)
- Test depth: 45 metres (148 feet)
- Complement: 26 (2 officers, 24 men)
- Armament: 2 × 450 mm (17.7 in) torpedo tubes (2 bow); 4 x torpedoes; 1 × 76 mm (3 in) deck gun
- Notes: SOURCE:

F4 was an F-class submarine in commission in the Italian Regia Marina (Royal Navy) from 1917 to 1919. She took part in World War I, conducting antisubmarine patrols in the Mediterranean Sea during the Mediterranean U-boat campaign. She sank accidentally in 1917, but was salvaged and returned to service.

== Construction and commissioning ==
F4 was laid down by Cantiere navale fratelli Orlando (Orlando Brothers Shipyard) in Livorno (Leghorn), Italy, on 8 June 1915. She was launched on 19 November 1916 and commissioned on 18 January 1917.

== Service history ==
The Italian Regia Marina (Royal Navy) assigned F4 to duty with the La Spezia Maritime Command in January 1917 during the Mediterranean U-boat campaign of World War I. She conducted a number of cruises and antisubmarine patrols in the northern Tyrrhenian Sea and in the waters off La Maddalena, Sardinia. While on the surface during a voyage from La Maddalena to La Spezia under escort by the tug Ercole on 3 April 1917, F4 sighted a Central Powers submarine on the surface and opened fire on it with her deck gun. The enemy submarine submerged and escaped.

While F4 was in port at La Spezia on 7 July 1917, her crew made a mistake that opened her torpedo room to the sea, resulting in uncontrollable flooding. F4′s crew abandoned ship without loss of life, and she sank by the bow and came to rest on her starboard side on a steeply sloped section of the seabed. She was refloated quickly, underwent repairs, and returned to service.

By 23 October 1918, F4 was deployed at Brindisi as part of the 3rd Submarine Squadron and assigned to operations in the Adriatic Campaign. World War I ended in November 1918 before she could conduct any war patrols in the Adriatic Sea.

F4 was decommissioned on 1 September 1919. She subsequently was scrapped.
