= Italian submarine F8 =

Italian Navy submarine of 1917–1919

- F8 during her acceptance trials prior to her delivery to the Italian Regia Marina (Royal Navy).

History

Italy
- Name: F8
- Builder: FIAT-San Giorgio, La Spezia, Italy
- Laid down: 12 June 1915
- Launched: 13 November 1916
- Commissioned: 2 February 1917
- Decommissioned: 1 September 1919
- Identification: Pennant number F8
- Motto: Ricordati e aspetta (Remember and wait)
- Fate: Scrapped

General characteristics
- Class & type: F-class submarine
- Displacement: 262 long tons (266 t) (surfaced); 319 long tons (324 t) (submerged)
- Length: 45.6 m (149 ft 7 in) (overall); 45.1 m (148 ft 0 in) (between perpendiculars)
- Beam: 4.2 m (13 ft 9 in)
- Draught: 3.1 m (10 ft 2 in)
- Propulsion: 2 × 670 bhp (500 kW) Fiat diesel engines; 2 × 500 hp (373 kW) Savigliano electric motors; 2 x shafts; 15 tons diesel fuel
- Speed: 12.5 knots (23.2 km/h; 14.4 mph) (surfaced); 8.2 knots (15.2 km/h; 9.4 mph) (submerged)
- Range: 1,600 nmi (3,000 km; 1,800 mi) at 8.5 knots (15.7 km/h; 9.8 mph) (surfaced); 80 nmi (150 km; 92 mi) at 4 knots (7.4 km/h; 4.6 mph) (submerged)
- Test depth: 45 metres (148 feet)
- Complement: 26 (2 officers, 24 men)
- Armament: 2 × 450 mm (17.7 in) torpedo tubes (2 bow); 4 x torpedoes; 1 × 76 mm (3 in) deck gun
- Notes: SOURCE:

F8 was an F-class submarine in commission in the Italian Regia Marina (Royal Navy) from 1917 to 1919. She sank during her workups but was salvaged without loss of life. She took part in the Adriatic Campaign of World War I.

== Construction and commissioning ==
F8 was laid down by FIAT-San Giorgio at La Spezia, Italy, on 12 June 1915. She was launched on 13 November 1916 and commissioned on 2 February 1917.

== Service history ==
F8 had been in commission for only 12 days when she sank off La Spezia on 14 February 1917 because of a maneuvering error during an exercise, coming to rest on the seabed 2 nautical miles (3.7 km; 2.3 mi) south of the island of Tino at a depth of 30 metres (98 feet). Her hull remained intact and her crew suffered no casualties. Fortunately, the Brazilian Navy submarine rescue ship Ceará, which had been constructed at La Spezia and recently had completed her sea trials, had not yet departed for her delivery voyage to Brazil. At the request of the Italian government, she delayed her departure and came to F8′s assistance. Ceará brought F8 to the surface without loss of life within 24 hours of the accident.

F8 spent most of the rest of 1917 in the dockyard at La Spezia undergoing inspection, cleaning, and a refit. Near the end of the year, she was ready for sea and was assigned to the 2nd Submarine Squadron at Venice. She began her transfer voyage on 14 December 1917, but during it suffered a failure in her gas exhaust valve, resulting in a leak and the explosion of a cylinder. As soon as she reached Venice, she entered dry dock for repair of the damage.

F8′s repairs were completed in March 1918, and she began operations in the Adriatic Sea during the Adriatic Campaign, conducting offensive war patrols off Trieste and Pola. She was transferred to the Ancona Submarine Flotilla in June 1918. Before World War I ended in November 1918, she had conducted 10 war patrols, but without significant results.

F8 was placed in reserve immediately after the war. She was decommissioned and stricken from the navy list on 1 September 1919. She subsequently was scrapped.
