= Italian submarine F13 =

Italian Navy submarine of 1917–1935

- F13 on a slipway in Livorno (Leghorn), Italy, presumably while under construction in 1917.

History

Italy
- Name: F13
- Builder: Orlando, Livorno, Italy
- Laid down: 20 September 1915
- Launched: 20 May 1917
- Commissioned: 5 August 1917
- Decommissioned: 1 August 1935
- Identification: Pennant number F13
- Motto: Gurgitibus hausta non labant corda ("Though drained by whirlpools, our hearts do not fail")
- Fate: Scrapped

General characteristics
- Class & type: F-class submarine
- Displacement: 262 long tons (266 t) (surfaced); 319 long tons (324 t) (submerged)
- Length: 45.6 m (149 ft 7 in) (overall); 45.1 m (148 ft 0 in) (between perpendiculars)
- Beam: 4.2 m (13 ft 9 in)
- Draught: 3.1 m (10 ft 2 in)
- Propulsion: 2 × 670 bhp (500 kW) Fiat diesel engines; 2 × 500 hp (373 kW) Savigliano electric motors; 2 x shafts; 15 tons diesel fuel
- Speed: 12.5 knots (23.2 km/h; 14.4 mph) (surfaced); 8.2 knots (15.2 km/h; 9.4 mph) (submerged)
- Range: 1,600 nmi (3,000 km; 1,800 mi) at 8.5 knots (15.7 km/h; 9.8 mph) (surfaced); 80 nmi (150 km; 92 mi) at 4 knots (7.4 km/h; 4.6 mph) (submerged)
- Test depth: 45 metres (148 feet)
- Complement: 26 (2 officers, 24 men)
- Armament: 2 × 450 mm (17.7 in) torpedo tubes (2 bow); 4 x torpedoes; 1 × 76 mm (3 in) deck gun
- Notes: SOURCE:

F13 was an F-class submarine in commission in the Italian Regia Marina (Royal Navy) from 1917 to 1935. She took part in World War I, seeing service in the Adriatic Campaign.

== Construction and commissioning ==
F13 was laid down by Cantiere navale fratelli Orlando (Orlando Brothers Shipyard) in Livorno (Leghorn), Italy, on 7 October 1915. She was launched on 27 May 1917 and commissioned on 13 August 1917 under the command of Tenente di vascello (Ship-of-the-Line Lieutenant) Manlio Tarantini, a future ammiraglio (admiral).

== Service history ==
In September 1917, F13 was assigned to the Ancona Maritime Command, based operationally at Porto Corsini and Venice. Taking part in the Adriatic Campaign of World War I, she conducted 11 offensive war patrols in enemy waters, both along Austro-Hungarian merchant shipping routes and in the approaches to the ports of Pola and Trieste. Her most noteworthy action occurred on 16 November 1917, when she and her sister ship F11 intercepted an Austro-Hungarian Navy formation composed of the coastal defense ships Budapest and Wien, escorted by torpedo boats, minesweepers, and seaplanes, which was bombarding Italian coastal defenses at Cortellazzo on the Piave River. The two submarines and two MAS boats intervened in an attempt to force the Austro-Hungarian ships to withdraw. Although under heavy fire by several Austro-Hungarian torpedo boats, F13 was undamaged, and her entire crew received a commendation for their actions duiring the engagement.

World War I ended in November 1918, and after the war F13 operated mainly in the northern Adriatic Sea as a Mechanics Training School unit in Venice and Pola. In October 1923, she was assigned to a new base at Brindisi, and while moving to Brindisi that month made port calls at Pola, Zara (now Zadar), and Lastovo (known to the Italians as Lagosta). In 1924 she took part in torpedo-firing drills, and she participated in major naval maneuvers held in August 1924.

In February 1926, F13 was reassigned to Pola, but she returned to Brindisi in August 1926. She participated in training cruises in 1927, one of them in the Adriatic Sea alongside other units of the Italian fleet.

F13 later was placed in reserve with a reduced crew. She was decommissioned and stricken from the navy list on 1 August 1935.
