= Italian submarine F17 =

Italian Navy submarine of 1917–1935

- F17 passing under the Ponte Girevole (swing bridge) in Taranto, Italy.

History

Italy
- Name: F17
- Builder: Orlando, Livorno, Italy
- Laid down: 14 October 1915
- Launched: 3 June 1917
- Commissioned: 17 August 1917
- Decommissioned: 1 November 1929
- Identification: Pennant number F17
- Motto: Contra fata audentior ("More boldly against the fates")
- Fate: Scrapped

General characteristics
- Class & type: F-class submarine
- Displacement: 262 long tons (266 t) (surfaced); 319 long tons (324 t) (submerged)
- Length: 45.6 m (149 ft 7 in) (overall); 45.1 m (148 ft 0 in) (between perpendiculars)
- Beam: 4.2 m (13 ft 9 in)
- Draught: 3.1 m (10 ft 2 in)
- Propulsion: 2 × 670 bhp (500 kW) Fiat diesel engines; 2 × 500 hp (373 kW) Savigliano electric motors; 2 x shafts; 15 tons diesel fuel
- Speed: 12.5 knots (23.2 km/h; 14.4 mph) (surfaced); 8.2 knots (15.2 km/h; 9.4 mph) (submerged)
- Range: 1,600 nmi (3,000 km; 1,800 mi) at 8.5 knots (15.7 km/h; 9.8 mph) (surfaced); 80 nmi (150 km; 92 mi) at 4 knots (7.4 km/h; 4.6 mph) (submerged)
- Test depth: 45 metres (148 feet)
- Complement: 26 (2 officers, 24 men)
- Armament: 2 × 450 mm (17.7 in) torpedo tubes (2 bow); 4 x torpedoes; 1 × 76 mm (3 in) deck gun
- Notes: SOURCE:

F17 was an F-class submarine in commission in the Italian Regia Marina (Royal Navy) from 1917 to 1929. She took part in World War I, performing antisubmarine patrols during the Mediterranean U-boat campaign and seeing service in the Adriatic Campaign.

== Construction and commissioning ==
F17 was laid down by Cantiere navale fratelli Orlando (Orlando Brothers Shipyard) in Livorno (Leghorn), Italy, on 14 October 1915. She was launched on 3 June 1917 and commissioned on 17 August 1917 under the command of Tenente di vascello (Ship-of-the-Line Lieutenant) Angelo Parona, a future ammiraglio di divisione (divisional admiral).

== Service history ==
In August 1917, the Italian Regia Marina (Royal Navy) assigned F17 to duty with the La Spezia Maritime Command during the Mediterranean U-boat campaign of World War I. Under its control, she conducted antisubmarine patrols in the northern Tyrrhenian Sea.

F17 became part of the 2nd Brindisi Flotilla on 14 January 1918 for operations in the Adriatic Sea and subsequently took part in the Adriatic Campaign of World War I. She initially operated as part of the mobile defense of the naval base at Brindisi. In April 1918, she transferred to a base at Venice, from which she conducted six offensive war patrols along the coast of Istria and in the Fasana Channel, but without significant results.

World War I ended in November 1918. After the war, F17 was transferred to the Venice Submarine Squadron. In 1925 she moved to the Submarine Division Command based at Taranto. It took part in the naval maneuvers of 1926 from 11 June to 3 July, during which she called at Messina in Sicily and at Naples before returning to Taranto. With the other submarines of the 2nd Flotilla, she also participated in the 1927 naval maneuvers, held 4 June to 3 July, during which she made port calls in Sicily at Messina, Catania, and Syracuse before returning to Taranto.

In July 1929, F17 hosted a test in the Gulf of La Spezia by Tenente di vascello (Ship-of-the-Line Lieutenant) Angelo Belloni of a submarine rescue device he had invented.

F17 was decommissioned and stricken from the navy list on 1 November 1929. She subsequently was scrapped.
