= Italian submarine F3 =

Italian Navy submarine of 1916–1919

- F3 under tow during her acceptance trials in 1916.

History

Italy
- Name: F3
- Builder: FIAT-San Giorgio, La Spezia, Italy
- Laid down: 27 May 1915
- Launched: 6 July 1916
- Commissioned: 19 October 1916
- Decommissioned: 1 September 1919
- Identification: Pennant number F3
- Fate: Scrapped

General characteristics
- Class & type: F-class submarine
- Displacement: 262 long tons (266 t) (surfaced); 319 long tons (324 t) (submerged)
- Length: 45.6 m (149 ft 7 in) (overall); 45.1 m (148 ft 0 in) (between perpendiculars)
- Beam: 4.2 m (13 ft 9 in)
- Draught: 3.1 m (10 ft 2 in)
- Propulsion: 2 × 670 bhp (500 kW) Fiat diesel engines; 2 × 500 hp (373 kW) Savigliano electric motors; 2 x shafts; 15 tons diesel fuel
- Speed: 12.5 knots (23.2 km/h; 14.4 mph) (surfaced); 8.2 knots (15.2 km/h; 9.4 mph) (submerged)
- Range: 1,600 nmi (3,000 km; 1,800 mi) at 8.5 knots (15.7 km/h; 9.8 mph) (surfaced); 80 nmi (150 km; 92 mi) at 4 knots (7.4 km/h; 4.6 mph) (submerged)
- Test depth: 45 metres (148 feet)
- Complement: 26 (2 officers, 24 men)
- Armament: 2 × 450 mm (17.7 in) torpedo tubes (2 bow); 4 x torpedoes; 1 × 76 mm (3 in) deck gun
- Notes: SOURCE:

F3 was an F-class submarine in commission in the Italian Regia Marina (Royal Navy) from 1916 to 1919. She took part in World War I, seeing service in the Adriatic Campaign.

== Construction and commissioning ==
F3 was laid down by FIAT-San Giorgio at La Spezia, Italy, on 27 May 1915. She was launched on 6 July 1916 and was ready for sea trials in September 1916. She was commissioned on 19 October 1916.

== Service history ==
F3 was assigned to bases at Venice and Porto Corsini for operations in the Adriatic Campaign of World War I. Most of her activities involved offensive operations along the coast of Austria-Hungary in the central and northern Adriatic Sea. She conducted 15 war patrols in 1917 and another 15 in 1918, but with no significant results.

World War I ended in November 1918, and F3 was placed in reserve. She was decommissioned on 1 September 1919 and subsequently was scrapped.
