= Italian submarine F1 =

Italian Navy submarine of 1916–1930

- F1 departing Taranto, Italy.

History

Italy
- Name: F1
- Builder: FIAT-San Giorgio, La Spezia, Italy
- Laid down: 27 May 1915
- Launched: 2 April 1916
- Commissioned: 20 October 1916
- Decommissioned: 2 June 1930
- Stricken: 2 June 1930
- Identification: Pennant number F1
- Motto: Strenue descendes, victor ascendens (I descend boldly, I ascend victoriously)
- Fate: Scrapped

General characteristics
- Class & type: F-class submarine
- Displacement: 262 long tons (266 t) (surfaced); 319 long tons (324 t) (submerged)
- Length: 45.6 m (149 ft 7 in) (overall); 45.1 m (148 ft 0 in) (between perpendiculars)
- Beam: 4.2 m (13 ft 9 in)
- Draught: 3.1 m (10 ft 2 in)
- Propulsion: 2 × 670 bhp (500 kW) Fiat diesel engines; 2 × 500 hp (373 kW) Savigliano electric motors; 2 x shafts; 15 tons diesel fuel
- Speed: 12.5 knots (23.2 km/h; 14.4 mph) (surfaced); 8.2 knots (15.2 km/h; 9.4 mph) (submerged)
- Range: 1,600 nmi (3,000 km; 1,800 mi) at 8.5 knots (15.7 km/h; 9.8 mph) (surfaced); 80 nmi (150 km; 92 mi) at 4 knots (7.4 km/h; 4.6 mph) (submerged)
- Test depth: 45 metres (148 feet)
- Complement: 26 (2 officers, 24 men)
- Armament: 2 × 450 mm (17.7 in) torpedo tubes (2 bow); 4 x torpedoes; 1 × 76 mm (3 in) deck gun
- Notes: SOURCE:

F1 was the lead ship of the F-class submarines. She was in commission in the Italian Regia Marina (Royal Navy) from 1916 to 1930. She took part in World War I, seeing service in the Adriatic Campaign.

== Construction and commissioning ==
F1 immediately after her launch by FIAT-San Giorgio at La Spezia, Italy, on 2 April 1916.

F1 was laid down by FIAT-San Giorgio at La Spezia, Italy, on 27 May 1915. She was launched on 2 April 1916 and commissioned on 20 October 1916.

== Service history ==
F1 was assigned to the Ancona Submarine Flotilla for operations in the Adriatic Sea during the Adriatic Campaign of World War I. Arriving in the Adriatic in December 1916, she became her squadron's flagship. She conducted 30 war patrols — a mix of offensive patrols along Austria-Hungary′s maritime trade routes, defensive patrols along Italy's coast, and patrols carried out as part of the mobile defense of Venice — but with no significant results.

World War I ended in November 1918, and after the war F1 operated as part of the Venice Flotilla until May 1921. She then transferred to Taranto and became part of the 2nd Submarine Squadron there. She took part in the naval maneuvers of 1925 and took second prize in the attack and torpedo-firing competitions of 1926.

F1 was decommissioned and stricken from the navy list on 2 June 1930. She subsequently was scrapped.
