= Italian submarine F7 =

Italian Navy submarine of 1917–1929

History

Italy
- Name: F7
- Builder: FIAT-San Giorgio, La Spezia, Italy
- Laid down: 1 July 1915
- Launched: 23 December 1916
- Commissioned: 19 March 1917
- Decommissioned: 1 February 1929
- Identification: Pennant number F7
- Motto: Venne il dì nostro e vincere bisogna (Our day has come and we must win)
- Fate: Scrapped

General characteristics
- Class & type: F-class submarine
- Displacement: 262 long tons (266 t) (surfaced); 319 long tons (324 t) (submerged)
- Length: 45.6 m (149 ft 7 in) (overall); 45.1 m (148 ft 0 in) (between perpendiculars)
- Beam: 4.2 m (13 ft 9 in)
- Draught: 3.1 m (10 ft 2 in)
- Propulsion: 2 × 670 bhp (500 kW) Fiat diesel engines; 2 × 500 hp (373 kW) Savigliano electric motors; 2 x shafts; 15 tons diesel fuel
- Speed: 12.5 knots (23.2 km/h; 14.4 mph) (surfaced); 8.2 knots (15.2 km/h; 9.4 mph) (submerged)
- Range: 1,600 nmi (3,000 km; 1,800 mi) at 8.5 knots (15.7 km/h; 9.8 mph) (surfaced); 80 nmi (150 km; 92 mi) at 4 knots (7.4 km/h; 4.6 mph) (submerged)
- Test depth: 45 metres (148 feet)
- Complement: 26 (2 officers, 24 men)
- Armament: 2 × 450 mm (17.7 in) torpedo tubes (2 bow); 4 x torpedoes; 1 × 76 mm (3 in) deck gun
- Notes: SOURCE:

F7 was an F-class submarine in commission in the Italian Regia Marina (Royal Navy) from 1917 to 1929. She took part in the Adriatic Campaign of World War I, during which she sank two steamers.

== Construction and commissioning ==
F7 was laid down by FIAT-San Giorgio at La Spezia, Italy, on 1 July 1915. She was launched on 23 December 1916 and commissioned on 19 March 1917.

== Service history ==
Crewmen load a 450 mm (17.7-inch) torpedo aboard F7.

F7 was assigned to operations in the Adriatic Campaign of World War I. Initially stationed at Brindisi, she was transferred to the northern Adriatic Sea in January 1918, where she operated alternately from Venice and Porto Corsini.

On 12 February 1918, F7 sank the 245-gross register ton steamer Pelagosa — which was operating as an Austro-Hungarian Navy auxiliary warship and antisubmarine patrol vessel — near Grujica Island (known to the Italians as Guizza Rock). She also sank the passenger-cargo ship SS Euterpe near Pag on 11 August 1918.

Off Point Mika on 29 August 1918, F7 fired a torpedo at a submarine and later at a steamer. In both cases, the torpedo malfunctioned and missed its target.

F7 also undertook minefield reconnaissance missions in the waters of the Maknare Channel (known to the Italians as the Passo delle Sette Bocche). During one of these she attacked a steamer about 3 nautical miles (5.6 km; 3.5 mi) from Škarda, but malfunctions in F7′s torpedo-firing mechanism prevented her from hitting the ship.

World War I ended in November 1918. After it ended, F7 served under the Venice naval command until April 1919. She then was stationed at Naples until 1923. In October 1925, she was transferred to the Submarine Division at Taranto. Throughout the postwar period, she participated in maneuvers, attack exercises, and torpedo-firing drills.

F7 was decommissioned and stricken from the navy list on 1 February 1929. She subsequently was scrapped.
