= Italian submarine F2 =

Italian Navy submarine of 1916–1919

History

Italy
- Name: F2
- Builder: FIAT-San Giorgio, La Spezia, Italy
- Laid down: 27 May 1915
- Launched: 4 June 1916
- Commissioned: 8 September 1916
- Decommissioned: 1 February 1929
- Identification: Pennant number F2
- Fate: Scrapped

General characteristics
- Class & type: F-class submarine
- Displacement: 262 long tons (266 t) (surfaced); 319 long tons (324 t) (submerged)
- Length: 45.6 m (149 ft 7 in) (overall); 45.1 m (148 ft 0 in) (between perpendiculars)
- Beam: 4.2 m (13 ft 9 in)
- Draught: 3.1 m (10 ft 2 in)
- Propulsion: 2 × 670 bhp (500 kW) Fiat diesel engines; 2 × 500 hp (373 kW) Savigliano electric motors; 2 x shafts; 15 tons diesel fuel
- Speed: 12.5 knots (23.2 km/h; 14.4 mph) (surfaced); 8.2 knots (15.2 km/h; 9.4 mph) (submerged)
- Range: 1,600 nmi (3,000 km; 1,800 mi) at 8.5 knots (15.7 km/h; 9.8 mph) (surfaced); 80 nmi (150 km; 92 mi) at 4 knots (7.4 km/h; 4.6 mph) (submerged)
- Test depth: 45 metres (148 feet)
- Complement: 26 (2 officers, 24 men)
- Armament: 2 × 450 mm (17.7 in) torpedo tubes (2 bow); 4 x torpedoes; 1 × 76 mm (3 in) deck gun
- Notes: SOURCE:

F2 was an F-class submarine in commission in the Italian Regia Marina (Royal Navy) from 1916 to 1929. She took part in World War I, seeing service in the Adriatic Campaign.

== Construction and commissioning ==
F2 was laid down by FIAT-San Giorgio at La Spezia, Italy, on 27 May 1915. She was launched on 4 June 1916 and was ready for sea trials on 17 June. She was commissioned on 8 September 1916.

== Service history ==
F2 underway at low speed in the Gulf of La Spezia.

F2 was assigned to the Ancona Submarine Flotilla, and was based at Venice and Porto Corsini for operations in the Adriatic Sea during the Adriatic Campaign of World War I. She conducted 35 war patrols along Austria-Hungary′s maritime trade routes and in the Fasana Channel, but with no significant results.

World War I ended in November 1918, and after the war F2 took part in naval maneuvers and torpedo firing drills. She was decommissioned on 1 February 1929 and subsequently was scrapped.
