= Italian submarine F5 =

Italian Navy submarine of 1916–1929

- F5 immediately after launching on 12 August 1916. She is dressed overall.

History

Italy
- Name: F5
- Builder: FIAT-San Giorgio, La Spezia, Italy
- Laid down: 23 May 1915
- Launched: 12 August 1916
- Commissioned: 26 November 1916
- Decommissioned: 20 July 1929
- Identification: Pennant number F5
- Motto: Te desposamus mare (We marry you, O sea)
- Fate: Scrapped

General characteristics
- Class & type: F-class submarine
- Displacement: 262 long tons (266 t) (surfaced); 319 long tons (324 t) (submerged)
- Length: 45.6 m (149 ft 7 in) (overall); 45.1 m (148 ft 0 in) (between perpendiculars)
- Beam: 4.2 m (13 ft 9 in)
- Draught: 3.1 m (10 ft 2 in)
- Propulsion: 2 × 670 bhp (500 kW) Fiat diesel engines; 2 × 500 hp (373 kW) Savigliano electric motors; 2 x shafts; 15 tons diesel fuel
- Speed: 12.5 knots (23.2 km/h; 14.4 mph) (surfaced); 8.2 knots (15.2 km/h; 9.4 mph) (submerged)
- Range: 1,600 nmi (3,000 km; 1,800 mi) at 8.5 knots (15.7 km/h; 9.8 mph) (surfaced); 80 nmi (150 km; 92 mi) at 4 knots (7.4 km/h; 4.6 mph) (submerged)
- Test depth: 45 metres (148 feet)
- Complement: 26 (2 officers, 24 men)
- Armament: 2 × 450 mm (17.7 in) torpedo tubes (2 bow); 4 x torpedoes; 1 × 76 mm (3 in) deck gun
- Notes: SOURCE:

F5 was an F-class submarine in commission in the Italian Regia Marina (Royal Navy) from 1916 to 1929. She took part in the Adriatic Campaign of World War I.

== Construction and commissioning ==
F5 was laid down by FIAT-San Giorgio at La Spezia, Italy, on 23 May 1915. She was launched on 12 August 1916 and commissioned on 26 November 1916.

== Service history ==
After completing her workups in the Gulf of La Spezia, F5 was assigned in February 1917 to the 2nd Submarine Squadron in the Ancona Maritime Command. Based at Venice and Porto Corsini, she operated in the Adriatic Sea during the Adriatic Campaign of World War I. Before the war ended in November 1918 she completed 26 war patrols along Austria-Hungary's maritime trade routes and in the approaches to Trieste and Pola, but without significant results. In the immediate aftermath of the war, she took part in the Italian occupation of Umag on the coast of Istria.

Early in 1919, F5 was assigned to a new operational base at Brindisi, but in May 1919 she was transferred to Naples. She participated in the naval maneuvers of 1924, 1925, 1926, and 1927, which required her to make long cruises in the waters off Sicily.

F5 was decommissioned on 20 July 1929. She subsequently was scrapped.
