= Italian submarine F18 =

Italian Navy submarine of 1917–1929

- F18 arriving at Taranto, Italy.

History

Italy
- Name: F18
- Builder: Odero, Sestri Ponente, Italy
- Laid down: 7 October 1915
- Launched: 15 May 1917
- Commissioned: 27 July 1917
- Decommissioned: 1 November 1929
- Stricken: 1 October 1930
- Identification: Pennant number F18
- Motto: Excelsis sub aequore ("Though underwater, higher")
- Fate: Scrapped

General characteristics
- Class & type: F-class submarine
- Displacement: 262 long tons (266 t) (surfaced); 319 long tons (324 t) (submerged)
- Length: 45.6 m (149 ft 7 in) (overall); 45.1 m (148 ft 0 in) (between perpendiculars)
- Beam: 4.2 m (13 ft 9 in)
- Draught: 3.1 m (10 ft 2 in)
- Propulsion: 2 × 670 bhp (500 kW) Fiat diesel engines; 2 × 500 hp (373 kW) Savigliano electric motors; 2 x shafts; 15 tons diesel fuel
- Speed: 12.5 knots (23.2 km/h; 14.4 mph) (surfaced); 8.2 knots (15.2 km/h; 9.4 mph) (submerged)
- Range: 1,600 nmi (3,000 km; 1,800 mi) at 8.5 knots (15.7 km/h; 9.8 mph) (surfaced); 80 nmi (150 km; 92 mi) at 4 knots (7.4 km/h; 4.6 mph) (submerged)
- Test depth: 45 metres (148 feet)
- Complement: 26 (2 officers, 24 men)
- Armament: 2 × 450 mm (17.7 in) torpedo tubes (2 bow); 4 x torpedoes; 1 × 76 mm (3 in) deck gun
- Notes: SOURCE:

F18 was an F-class submarine in commission in the Italian Regia Marina (Royal Navy) from 1917 to 1929. She took part in the Adriatic Campaign of World War I. She also participated in the Italian occupation of Corfu during the Corfu incident in 1923.

== Construction and commissioning ==
F18 was laid down by Cantieri navali Odero (Odero Shipyards) at Sestri Ponente, Italy, on 7 October 1915. She was launched on 15 May 1917 and commissioned on 27 July 1917.

== Service history ==
In October 1917, the Italian Regia Marina (Royal Navy) assigned F18 to the Ancona Submarine Squadron for operations in the Adriatic Sea during the Adriatic Campaign of World War I, and she began war patrols along the coast of Austria-Hungary.

On 15 July 1918, F18 fired a torpedo at a large tugboat off the coast of Dalmatia about 2 nautical miles (3.7 km; 2.3 mi) from Zaline Point near Cape Planka and the islands of Drvenik Veli and Drvenik Mali. The torpedo malfunctioned and missed. During the night of 15–16 July, she fired a torpedo at an Austro-Hungarian Navy torpedo boat, but the torpedo again malfunctioned and missed. She fired a torpedo at a steamer on 16 July, but the torpedo's gyrostat failed, causing the torpedo to go off course and explode on the nearby coast. By the time World War I ended in November 1918, F18 had carried out 10 war patrols, but without significant results.

F18 operated under the control of the Venice Maritime Command from the end of the World War I until 1922, when she transferred to the Brindisi Squadron. During the Corfu incident in 1923, she took part in the Italian occupation of Corfu. She was transferred to Naples and participated in that year's naval maneuvers, winning first prize in the attack and torpedo-firing competitions. In 1925 she was transferred to Taranto, and in the 1925 naval maneuvers repeated her success, again winning first prize in the attack and torpedo-firing competitions. She took part in the 1926 naval maneuvers, and later that year was transferred to the 3rd Squadron of the 2nd Flotilla of the Submarine Division Command, as part of which she took part in the naval maneuvers of 1927.

F18 was decommissioned on 1 November 1929 and stricken from the navy list on 1 October 1930. She subsequently was scrapped.
