= Italian submarine F19 =

Italian Navy submarine of 1918–1930

History

Italy
- Name: F19
- Builder: FIAT-San Giorgio, La Spezia, Italy
- Laid down: 23 September 1915
- Launched: 10 March 1918
- Commissioned: 24 April 1918
- Decommissioned: 2 June 1930
- Stricken: 2 June 1930
- Identification: Pennant number F19
- Motto: Cor patriae sub undis ("The heart of the fatherland beneath the waves")
- Fate: Scrapped

General characteristics
- Class & type: F-class submarine
- Displacement: 262 long tons (266 t) (surfaced); 319 long tons (324 t) (submerged)
- Length: 45.6 m (149 ft 7 in) (overall); 45.1 m (148 ft 0 in) (between perpendiculars)
- Beam: 4.2 m (13 ft 9 in)
- Draught: 3.1 m (10 ft 2 in)
- Propulsion: 2 × 670 bhp (500 kW) Fiat diesel engines; 2 × 500 hp (373 kW) Savigliano electric motors; 2 x shafts; 15 tons diesel fuel
- Speed: 12.5 knots (23.2 km/h; 14.4 mph) (surfaced); 8.2 knots (15.2 km/h; 9.4 mph) (submerged)
- Range: 1,600 nmi (3,000 km; 1,800 mi) at 8.5 knots (15.7 km/h; 9.8 mph) (surfaced); 80 nmi (150 km; 92 mi) at 4 knots (7.4 km/h; 4.6 mph) (submerged)
- Test depth: 45 metres (148 feet)
- Complement: 26 (2 officers, 24 men)
- Armament: 2 × 450 mm (17.7 in) torpedo tubes (2 bow); 4 x torpedoes; 1 × 76 mm (3 in) deck gun
- Notes: SOURCE:

F19 was an F-class submarine in commission in the Italian Regia Marina (Royal Navy) from 1918 to 1930. She took part in the Adriatic Campaign of World War I.

== Construction and commissioning ==
In June 1915, FIAT-San Giorgio laid down an F-class submarine for the Italian Regia Marina (Royal Navy) at La Spezia, Italy. Originally designated F19, that submarine was sold to Portugal and entered service in the Portuguese Navy as NRP Foca.

To replace the first F19, the Regia Marina ordered a second submarine also designated F19. FIAT-San Giorgio laid down the second F19 at La Spezia on 23 September 1915. She was launched on 10 March 1918 and commissioned into service in the Regia Marina as F19 on 24 April 1918.

== Service history ==
In August 1918, the Regia Marina assigned F19 to the Ancona Submarine Flotilla for operations in the Adriatic Sea during the Adriatic Campaign of World War I. Before the war ended in November 1918, she had carried out nine war patrols along the coast of Austria-Hungary, but without significant results. In the war's immediate aftermath she operated for some time in active sectors which had not yet undergone postwar military demobilization and on 15 November 1919 participated in the occupation of Umag on the coast of Istria. Her crew was the first Italian military force to raise the Italian flag in Umag.

F19 subsequently was transferred to the Naples Maritime Command, where she conducted training activities. She participated in the naval maneuvers of 1924 and 1925, and in December 1925 became the flagship of the 2nd Submarine Flotilla. She also took part in the naval maneuvers of 1926 and 1927.

F19 was placed in reserve in 1928. She was decommissioned and stricken from the navy list on 2 June 1930. She subsequently was scrapped.
