= Italian submarine F20 =

Italian Navy submarine of 1918–1935

- F20 underway sometime in the 1920s.

History

Italy
- Name: F20
- Builder: FIAT-San Giorgio, La Spezia, Italy
- Laid down: 10 September 1915
- Launched: 17 March 1918
- Commissioned: 7 June 1918
- Decommissioned: 1 July 1935
- Stricken: 1 July 1935
- Identification: Pennant number F20
- Motto: Porto armi sicure e cuori forti ("I carry safe weapons and strong hearts")
- Fate: Scrapped

General characteristics
- Class & type: F-class submarine
- Displacement: 262 long tons (266 t) (surfaced); 319 long tons (324 t) (submerged)
- Length: 45.6 m (149 ft 7 in) (overall); 45.1 m (148 ft 0 in) (between perpendiculars)
- Beam: 4.2 m (13 ft 9 in)
- Draught: 3.1 m (10 ft 2 in)
- Propulsion: 2 × 670 bhp (500 kW) Fiat diesel engines; 2 × 500 hp (373 kW) Savigliano electric motors; 2 x shafts; 15 tons diesel fuel
- Speed: 12.5 knots (23.2 km/h; 14.4 mph) (surfaced); 8.2 knots (15.2 km/h; 9.4 mph) (submerged)
- Range: 1,600 nmi (3,000 km; 1,800 mi) at 8.5 knots (15.7 km/h; 9.8 mph) (surfaced); 80 nmi (150 km; 92 mi) at 4 knots (7.4 km/h; 4.6 mph) (submerged)
- Test depth: 45 metres (148 feet)
- Complement: 26 (2 officers, 24 men)
- Armament: 2 × 450 mm (17.7 in) torpedo tubes (2 bow); 4 x torpedoes; 1 × 76 mm (3 in) deck gun
- Notes: SOURCE:

F20 was an F-class submarine in commission in the Italian Regia Marina (Royal Navy) from 1918 to 1935. She took part in the Adriatic Campaign of World War I.

== Construction and commissioning ==
In June 1915, FIAT-San Giorgio laid down an F-class submarine for the Italian Regia Marina (Royal Navy) at La Spezia, Italy. Originally designated F20, that submarine was sold to Portugal and entered service in the Portuguese Navy as NRP Golfinho.

To replace the first F20, the Regia Marina ordered a second submarine also designated F20. FIAT-San Giorgio laid down the second F20 at La Spezia on 10 September 1915. She was launched on 17 March 1918 and commissioned into service in the Regia Marina as F20 on 7 June 1918.

== Service history ==
In August 1918, the Italian Regia Marina (Royal Navy) assigned F20 to the Brindisi Submarine Squadron for operations in the southern Adriatic Sea during the Adriatic Campaign of World War I. Before the war ended in November 1918, she had carried out three war patrols along the coast of Austria-Hungary, but without significant results.

At the end of World War I, F20 was transferred to the Venice Maritime Command for operations in the northern Adriatic Sea. She returned to the Brindisi Submarine Squadron in April 1919, but was transferred to Naples in May 1919. In February 1923 she was transferred to the 3rd Squadron of the 2nd Submarine Flotilla at Taranto. She participated in the naval maneuvers of 1925 and 1926.

F20 was placed in reserve in January 1927. She was decommissioned and stricken from the navy list on 1 July 1935. She subsequently was scrapped.
