= Italian submarine F21 =

Italian Navy submarine of 1918–1930

History

Italy
- Name: F21
- Builder: FIAT-San Giorgio, La Spezia, Italy
- Laid down: 31 August 1915
- Launched: 19 May 1918
- Commissioned: 31 August 1918
- Decommissioned: 1 October 1930
- Stricken: 1 October 1930
- Identification: Pennant number F21
- Motto: Nobis ardua ("For us, the task is arduous")
- Fate: Scrapped

General characteristics
- Class & type: F-class submarine
- Displacement: 262 long tons (266 t) (surfaced); 319 long tons (324 t) (submerged)
- Length: 45.6 m (149 ft 7 in) (overall); 45.1 m (148 ft 0 in) (between perpendiculars)
- Beam: 4.2 m (13 ft 9 in)
- Draught: 3.1 m (10 ft 2 in)
- Propulsion: 2 × 670 bhp (500 kW) Fiat diesel engines; 2 × 500 hp (373 kW) Savigliano electric motors; 2 x shafts; 15 tons diesel fuel
- Speed: 12.5 knots (23.2 km/h; 14.4 mph) (surfaced); 8.2 knots (15.2 km/h; 9.4 mph) (submerged)
- Range: 1,600 nmi (3,000 km; 1,800 mi) at 8.5 knots (15.7 km/h; 9.8 mph) (surfaced); 80 nmi (150 km; 92 mi) at 4 knots (7.4 km/h; 4.6 mph) (submerged)
- Test depth: 45 metres (148 feet)
- Complement: 26 (2 officers, 24 men)
- Armament: 2 × 450 mm (17.7 in) torpedo tubes (2 bow); 4 x torpedoes; 1 × 76 mm (3 in) deck gun
- Notes: SOURCE:

F21 was an F-class submarine in commission in the Italian Regia Marina (Royal Navy) from 1918 to 1930. She took part in the Adriatic Campaign of World War I.

== Construction and commissioning ==
The conning tower of F21, with crewmen on the bridge.

In July 1915, FIAT-San Giorgio laid down an F-class submarine for the Italian Regia Marina (Royal Navy) at La Spezia, Italy. Originally designated F21, that submarine was sold to Portugal and entered service in the Portuguese Navy as NRP Hidra.

To replace the first F21, the Regia Marina ordered a second submarine also designated F21. FIAT-San Giorgio laid down the second F21 at La Spezia on 31 August 1915. She was launched on 19 May 1918 and commissioned into service in the Regia Marina as F20 on 31 August 1918.

== Service history ==
After F21 completed workups, the Regia Marina assigned her to the Brindisi Submarine Squadron for operations in the southern Adriatic Sea during the Adriatic Campaign of World War I. Before the war ended in November 1918, she had carried out two war patrols along the coast of Austria-Hungary, but without significant results. After World War I, she participated in numerous training exercises and in naval maneuvers with surface warships.

F21 was decommissioned and stricken from the navy list on 1 October 1930. She subsequently was scrapped.
