= Italian F-class submarine =

Italian Navy submarines

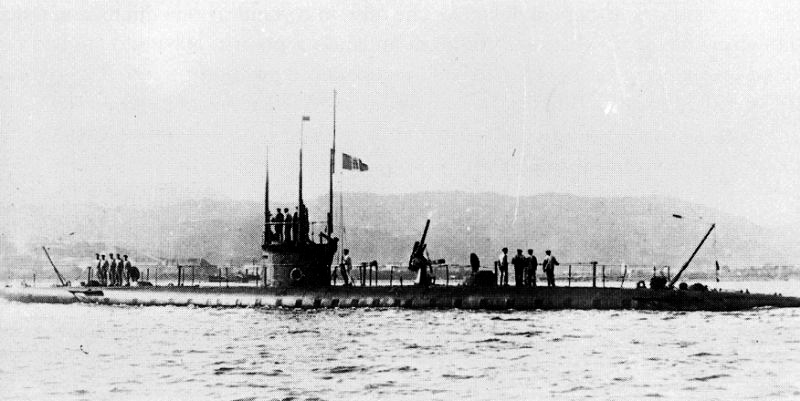
- F6

Class overview
- Name: F class
- Builders: FIAT-San Giorgio, La Spezia, Italy; Odero, Sestri Ponente, Italy; Orlando, Livorno, Italy
- Operators: Regia Marina; Portuguese Navy; (Spain) Spanish Navy
- Preceded by: Pacinotti-class
- Succeeded by: N class
- Built: 1915–1918
- In commission: 1916–1935
- Completed: 27
- Lost: 1
- Retired: 26

General characteristics
- Type: Submarine
- Displacement: 262 long tons (266 t) (surfaced); 319 long tons (324 t) (submerged)
- Length: 45.6 m (149 ft 7 in) (overall); 45.1 m (148 ft 0 in) (between perpendiculars)
- Beam: 4.2 m (13 ft 9 in)
- Draught: 3.1 m (10 ft 2 in)
- Propulsion: 2 × 670 bhp (500 kW) Fiat diesel engines; 2 × 500 hp (373 kW) Savigliano electric motors; 2 x shafts; 15 tons diesel fuel
- Speed: 12.5 knots (23.2 km/h; 14.4 mph) (surfaced); 8.2 knots (15.2 km/h; 9.4 mph) (submerged)
- Range: 1,600 nmi (3,000 km; 1,800 mi) at 8.5 knots (15.7 km/h; 9.8 mph) (surfaced); 80 nmi (150 km; 92 mi) at 4 knots (7.4 km/h; 4.6 mph) (submerged)
- Test depth: 45 metres (148 feet)
- Complement: 26 (2 officers, 24 men)
- Armament: 2 × 450 mm (17.7 in) torpedo tubes (2 bow); 4 x torpedoes; 1 × 76 mm (3 in) deck gun
- Notes: SOURCE:

The F class consisted of 27 submarines constructed in the Kingdom of Italy between 1915 and 1918. They were the most numerous class of submarines constructed for the Italian Regia Marina (Royal Navy) during World War I. Twenty-one of them served in the Regia Marina. Three others were sold to Portugal, where they served in the Portuguese Navy as the Foca class. Another three were constructed for Spain, serving in the Spanish Navy as the A class.

== Design ==
Between 1913 and 1915, the FIAT-San Giorgio shipyard at La Spezia, Italy, built five submarines for Brazil which served in the Brazilian Navy as the F class or Foca class. The Italian Regia Marina (Royal Navy) was quite impressed with the design of the Brazilian submarines and ordered the construction of submarines of an improved design for its own use. In Italy, these also were known as the F class.

The F class were small, coastal submarines of the Laurenti type, developed from the earlier Medusa class. Like all Laurenti-type submarines, they had a full double-hull design with an internal pressure hull with variable-section shaping tailoring the hull shape to optimize it for the submarines' machinery, requiring them to have very thick hulls to allow a greater collapse depth. They were agile and maneuverable, optimized for use in enclosed waters like those of the Adriatic Sea. They had radio and a faster diving time than the Brazilian submarines on which their design was based. Unlike the Brazilian submarines, the Italian F class had a deck gun, two periscopes, a gyrocompass, and a Fessenden-type hydrophone and underwater signaling system. Those numbered F13 and higher had their aft diving planes relocated below the waterline and made fixed. Some of the later submarines to enter service had a bridge screen fitted to their conning towers, changing their silhouette significantly.

The F-class submarines had a length overall of 45.6 metres (149 ft 7 in), a length between perpendiculars of 45.1 metres (148 ft 0 in), a beam of 4.2 metres (13 ft 9 in), and a draft of 3.1 metres (10 ft 2 in). They displaced 262 long tons (266 t) on the surface and 319 long tons (324 t) submerged.

Two Fiat 670 bhp (500 kW) diesel engines driving two screws gave the F-class submarines a top speed on the surface of 12.5 knots (23.2 km/h; 14.4 mph). Their two 500 hp (373 kW) Savigliano electric motors gave them a maximum submerged speed of 8.2 knots (15.2 km/h; 9.4 mph). They could carry 15 tons of diesel fuel, and on the surface they had a range of 1,600 nmi (1,800 mi; 3,000 km) at 8.5 knots (15.7 km/h; 9.8 mph). Submerged, their range was 80 nmi (92 mi; 148 km) at 4 knots (7.4 km/h; 4.6 mph).

Each F-class submarine had two 450 mm (17.7-inch) torpedo tubes, both in the bow, and carried four torpedoes. Each submarine also had a 76 mm (3-inch) deck gun.

The F-class submarines had a crew of 26, consisting of two officers and 24 enlisted men. They had a diving depth of 45 metres (148 feet).

== Construction ==
Italian shipyards constructed 21 F-class submarines for Italian service, numbered F1 through F21. FIAT-San Giorgio built 13 of them at La Spezia, while the Cantiere navale fratelli Orlando (Orlando Brothers Shipyard) built five at Livorno (Leghorn) and the Cantieri navali Odero (Odero Shipyards) built three at Sestri Ponente.

FIAT-San Giorgio constructed six additional F-class submarines for foreign sale. Three laid down in 1915 and originally numbered F19, F20, and F21 were sold to Portugal while under construction, and they entered service in the Portuguese Navy as the Foca class. Italy replaced them by ordering three additional submarines for the Regia Marina also laid down in 1915 and also numbered F19, F20, and F21, and these were commissioned in the Regia Marina in 1918.

Three other submarines FIAT-San Giorgio laid down at La Spezia in 1915 and 1916 were numbered F22, F23, and F24. These were sold to Spain, where they served in the Spanish Navy as the A class.

== Submarines of the class ==
=== Italian F class ===
F4 sank in an accident in port at La Spezia on 7 July 1917, but was refloated and repaired.

F8 sank at La Spezia on 14 February 1917 during her sea trials, but she was refloated, repaired, and in service by September 1917.

F14 sank in the Adriatic Sea with the loss of her entire crew in 1928 after colliding with the destroyer Giuseppe Missori during an exercise off Pula, Yugoslavia. She was raised and scrapped.

Ship name	Builder	Laid down	Launched	Commissioned	Decommissioned	Fate
F1	FIAT-San Giorgio, La Spezia, Italy	27 May 1915	2 April 1916	20 October 1916	2 June 1930	Stricken 2 June 1930; scrapped
F2	FIAT-San Giorgio, La Spezia, Italy	3 June 1915	4 June 1916	8 September 1916		Stricken 1 February 1929
F3	FIAT-San Giorgio, La Spezia, Italy	27 May 1915	6 July 1916	19 October 1916		Stricken 1 September 1919
F4	Orlando, Livorno, Italy	8 June 1915	19 November 1916	18 January 1917		Stricken 1 September 1919
F5	FIAT-San Giorgio, La Spezia, Italy	23 May 1915	12 August 1916	26 November 1916		Stricken 20 July 1929
F6	Orlando, Livorno, Italy	16 June 1915	4 March 1917	1 May 1917		Stricken 1 August 1935
F7	FIAT-San Giorgio, La Spezia, Italy	1 July 1915	23 December 1916	19 March 1917		Stricken 1 February 1929
F8	FIAT-San Giorgio, La Spezia, Italy	12 June 1915	13 November 1916	2 February 1917		Stricken 1 September 1919
F9	FIAT-San Giorgio, La Spezia, Italy	3 June 1915	24 September 1916	29 December 1916		Stricken 1 August 1928
F10	FIAT-San Giorgio, La Spezia, Italy	31 August 1915	19 October 1916	29 December 1916		Stricken 2 June 1930
F11	FIAT-San Giorgio, La Spezia, Italy	17 July 1915	17 September 1916	29 December 1916		Stricken 1 September 1919
F12	FIAT-San Giorgio, La Spezia, Italy	29 July 1915	30 November 1916	26 February 1917		Stricken 20 July 1929
F13	Orlando, Livorno, Italy	30 September 1915	20 May 1917	5 August 1917		Stricken 1 August 1935
F14	Odero, Sestri Ponente, Italy	2 October 1915	23 January 1917	18 March 1917		Sunk in collision 6 August 1928; refloated; stricken 29 November 1928; scrapped
F15	Orlando, Livorno, Italy	7 October 1915	27 May 1917	13 August 1917		Stricken 28 May 1929
F16	Odero, Sestri Ponente, Italy	4 October 1915	19 March 1917	30 April 1917		Stricken 1 May 1928
F17	Orlando, Livorno, Italy	14 October 1915	3 June 1917	17 August 1917		Stricken 1 November 1929
F18	Odero, Sestri Ponente, Italy	7 October 1915	15 May 1917	27 July 1917	1 November 1929	Stricken 1 October 1930
F19 (i)	FIAT-San Giorgio, La Spezia, Italy	3 June 1915	2 April 1916	—N/a	—N/a	Sold to Portugal
F20 (i)	FIAT-San Giorgio, La Spezia, Italy	8 June 1915	4 June 1916	—N/a	—N/a	Sold to Portugal
F21 (i)	FIAT-San Giorgio, La Spezia, Italy	1 July 1915	6 July 1916	—N/a	—N/a	Sold to Portugal
F19 (ii)	FIAT-San Giorgio, La Spezia, Italy	23 September 1915	10 March 1918	24 April 1918		Stricken 2 June 1930
F20 (ii)	FIAT-San Giorgio, La Spezia, Italy	10 September 1915	17 March 1918	7 June 1918		Stricken 1 July 1935
F21 (ii)	FIAT-San Giorgio, La Spezia, Italy	31 August 1915	19 May 1918	31 August 1918		Stricken 1 October 1930
F22	FIAT-San Giorgio, La Spezia, Italy	28 September 1915	10 April 1917	—N/a	—N/a	Sold to Spain
F23	FIAT-San Giorgio, La Spezia, Italy	9 September 1915	17 June 1917	—N/a	—N/a	Sold to Spain
F24	FIAT-San Giorgio, La Spezia, Italy	23 March 1916	16 June 1917	—N/a	—N/a	Sold to Spain

=== Portuguese Foca class ===
Ship name	Builder	Laid down	Launched	Commissioned	Decommissioned	Fate
Foca, ex-F19 (i)	FIAT-San Giorgio, La Spezia, Italy	3 June 1915	2 April 1916	5 September 1917		Discarded 1935
Golfinho, ex-F20 (i)	FIAT-San Giorgio, La Spezia, Italy	8 June 1915	4 June 1916	5 September 1917		Discarded 1934
Hidra, ex-F-21 (i)	FIAT-San Giorgio, La Spezia, Italy	1 July 1915	6 July 1916	1 October 1917		Discarded 1935

=== Spanish A class ===
On 28 June 1927, Cosme García sank pierside at Barcelona without loss of life when her torpedo tube doors malfunctioned. She was refloated, repaired, and returned to service.

After the Second Spanish Republic replaced the Kingdom of Spain in 1931, the three Spanish submarines were part of the Spanish Republican Navy late in their service lives.

Ship name	Builder	Laid down	Launched	Commissioned	Decommissioned	Fate
Narcíso Monturiol (A-1), ex-F22	FIAT-San Giorgio, La Spezia, Italy	28 September 1915	10 April 1917	25 August 1917		Stricken 1 January 1934; Disarmed March 1935; discarded
Cosme García (A-2), ex-F23	FIAT-San Giorgio, La Spezia, Italy	9 September 1915	17 June 1917	25 August 1917		Stricken 17 December 1931; discarded 1930s
A-3, ex-F24	FIAT-San Giorgio, La Spezia, Italy	23 March 1916	16 June 1917	25 August 1917		Stricken 18 May 1932; discarded 1930s
