= Mediterranean U-boat campaign of World War I =

Mediterranean U-boat Campaign
- Part of the Mediterranean Theatre of World War I
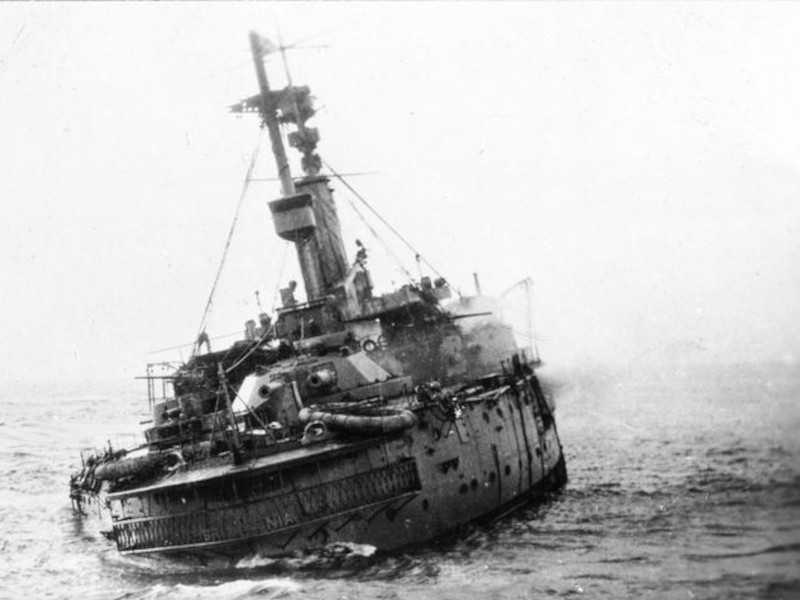
- HMS Britannia sinking near Gibraltar on 9 November 1918
Date	1914 – 9 November 1918
Location	Mediterranean Sea

Belligerents
British Empire; Kingdom of Italy; France	Austria-Hungary; German Empire; Ottoman Empire; Kingdom of Bulgaria

The Mediterranean U-boat Campaign in the Mediterranean Sea was fought by Austria-Hungary and German Empire (with some support by the Ottoman Empire) against the Allies during World War I. It was characterised by the ability of the Central Powers to raid with near impunity during the first years of the war, causing substantial shipping losses, until the introduction of the convoy system allowed the Allies to drastically cut their losses from 1917 on.

== History ==
=== 1914: Initial stages ===
At the outbreak of World War I, with Italy's decision to remain neutral, the naval strength of the Central Powers was represented by the navy of the Austro-Hungarian Empire, the KuK Kriegsmarine, whose only access to the sea was through the Adriatic coast. The Entente powers moved swiftly to blockade the Adriatic, sending a fleet to take station at the straits of Otranto.

The initial phase of the U-boat campaign in the Mediterranean comprised the actions by the KuK's U-boat force against the French. At the start of hostilities, the KuK had seven U-boats in commission; five operational, and two training; all were of the coastal type, with limited range and endurance, suitable for operation in the Adriatic.

Nevertheless, they had a number of successes. On 21 December 1914, U-12 torpedoed the French battleship Jean Bart, Admiral Lapeyrere's flagship. She was saved from sinking, but was forced to retire with a damaged bow. This setback dissuaded the French capital ships from penetrating too far into the Adriatic. On 27 April 1915, U-5 sank the French cruiser Léon Gambetta, with heavy loss of life.

But the KuK boats were unable to offer any interference to allied traffic in the Mediterranean beyond the Straits of Otranto.

=== 1915 ===
==== Operations at the Dardanelles ====
In April 1915, the Imperial German Navy sent their first submarines to the Mediterranean in response to the Anglo-French Dardanelles campaign, after it became obvious that their Austro-Hungarian allies could do little against it with their small submarine force, which nevertheless was successful in defending the Adriatic.

The first U-boat sent—U-21—achieved initial success, sinking the Royal Navy predreadnought battleships HMS Triumph and Majestic on 25 and 27 May respectively on her way to Constantinople, but ran into severe limitations in the Dardanelles, where swarms of small craft and extensive anti-submarine netting and booms restricted their movements. In addition, the Germans dispatched a number of UB and UC type boats; these were sent in sections by rail to Pola where they were assembled for transit to Constantinople. One was lost, but by the end of 1915 the Germans had established a force of seven U-boats at Constantinople, misleadingly named the Mediterranean U-Boat Division.

==== Pola Flotilla ====
At the same time, the Germans determined to establish a force in the Adriatic to open the commerce war against Allied trade in the Mediterranean.

By the end of June 1915, the Germans had assembled a further three pre-fabricated Type UB I submarines at Pola in Istria, two of them intended for transfer to the Austrian Navy. They were also assembling three Type UC I minelaying submarines, which were ordered converted into transports to carry small quantities of critical supplies to Turkey. However, the UB submarines were hindered by their short operational range and the Dardanelles currents, and in July U-21—the only U-boat with a decent operating range—was damaged by a mine and confined to Constantinople.

On 21 July, the ocean-going submarines U-34 and U-35 were detached from service in the Baltic and sent to Cattaro (in present-day Montenegro), the Germans deciding to make use of Austrian bases rather than Constantinople, since there were better supply and repair facilities in the Adriatic and it avoided submarines having to negotiate the dangerous passage through the Dardanelles. In August, U-33 and U-39 joined the German flotilla stationed at Cattaro, following pleas from the German military attaché in Constantinople, who reported that the Royal Navy's close naval support was inflicting heavy losses on Turkish forces at the Gallipoli beachheads.

==== War on commerce ====
The Mediterranean was an attractive theatre of operations for the German Admiralstab's war on Allied commerce; a significant proportion of British imports passed through it, it was critical to French and Italian trade, and submarines would be able to operate effectively in it even in the northern-hemisphere autumn and winter, when poor weather hampered naval operations in the Atlantic and the North Sea. Additionally, there were certain choke points through which shipping had to pass, such as the Suez Canal, Malta, Crete, and Gibraltar. Finally, the Mediterranean offered the advantage that fewer neutral ships would be encountered, such as U.S. vessels, and fewer American citizens travelled the waters.

The German campaign in the Mediterranean is generally agreed to have properly begun in October 1915, when U-33 and U-39, followed later by U-35, were ordered to attack the approaches to Salonika and Kavalla. That month, 18 ships were sunk, for a total of 63,848 long tons (64,873 t). It was decided the same month that further reinforcements were called for, and a further large U-boat—U-38—sailed for Cattaro. Since Germany was not yet at war with Italy, even though Austria was, the German submarines were ordered to refrain from attacking Italian shipping in the eastern Mediterranean where the Italians might expect hostile action only from German submarines. When operating in the west, up to the line of Cape Matapan, the German U-boats flew the Austrian flag, and a sinking without warning policy was adopted, since large merchant ships could be attacked on the suspicion of being transports or auxiliary cruisers.

The German Admiralty also decided that the Type UB II submarines would be ideal for Mediterranean service. Since these were too large to be shipped in sections by rail to Pola like the Type UB I, the materials for their construction and German workers to assemble them were sent instead. This meant a shortage of workers to complete U-boats for service in home waters, but it seemed justified by the successes in the Mediterranean in November, when 44 ships were sunk, for a total of 155,882 long tons (158,383 t). The total in December fell to 17 ships (73,741 long tons (74,924 t)) which was still over ½ the total tonnage sunk in all theatres of operation at the time.

==== Ancona incident ====
In November 1915, U-38—sailing under the Austrian flag and commanded by Kapitanleutnant (K/L) Max Valentiner—caused a diplomatic incident when she sank the Italian passenger liner SS Ancona off the coast of Tunisia. Ancona—bound from Messina to New York City—was fully booked and over 200 people were killed, including nine Americans. Coming as it did six months after the sinking of the British liner RMS Lusitania off Ireland, the Ancona incident added to a growing outrage in the U.S. over unrestricted submarine warfare, and U.S. Secretary of State Robert Lansing despatched a sternly-worded protest to Vienna.

In December 1915, Valentiner caused further outrage when he sank the passenger liner SS Persia without warning, with 343 killed.

In a further incident in March 1916, the German minelayer UC-12 was blown up by her own mines while laying a mine field off Taranto harbor. Italian divers inspected the wreck and established her identity. The knowledge that Germany—technically their ally—was assiduously mining their naval bases was a contributing factor in Italy's decision in May 1916 to declare war on Germany.

=== 1916: Commerce war continues ===
During 1916, the commerce war continued unabated. Allied countermeasures were largely ineffective; the complex arrangements for co-operation between the various navies meant a fragmented and unco-ordinated response, while the main remedy favoured by the Allies for the U-boat menace was to establish an anti-submarine barrier across the Straits of Otranto, the Otranto Barrage. This too was ineffective; the straits were too wide and deep for such a barrage to be successful, and consumed a huge effort and tied up a number of the patrol vessels the Allies possessed. It also acted as a target for surface attacks, being the aim of a number of raids by KuK forces. Just two U-boats were caught in the barrage in all the time it was in operation; meanwhile the merchant ships continued to suffer huge losses. In 1916, the Allies lost 415 ships, of 1,045,058 long tons (1,061,828 t), ½ of all allied ships sunk in all theatres.

Eight of the top twelve U-boat aces served in the Pola Flotilla, including the highest scoring commander of all, K/L Arnauld de la Perière.

=== 1917: Unrestricted submarine warfare ===
In January 1917, following the German decision to resume unrestricted submarine warfare, Foreign Secretary Arthur Zimmermann led a delegation to Vienna to secure the collaboration of Austria-Hungary. Grand Admiral Haus wholly supported the proposal, but Foreign Minister Count Ottokar Czernin had misgivings, as did the emperor, Charles I of Austria. Haus and the German delegates finally won the debate, partly by listing several instances where Allied submarines had sunk unarmed Austro-Hungarian ships in the Adriatic. The negotiations over the terms of the new Mediterranean submarine campaign were aided by the fact that Italy had declared war on Germany on 28 August 1916, making it no longer necessary for German U-boats to masquerade as Austrian vessels when attacking Italian shipping.

Shipping losses to U-boats reached a peak in April 1917, when the Central Powers had 28 boats operating, with as many as 10 at sea at any one time. While not a single submarine was sunk, they caused 94 ship losses in that one month, and severely endangered and delayed shipping. However, by that time, the Italian Navy had instituted convoy operations, with the British following on the Alexandria-Malta route in May 1917.

==== Japanese participation ====
Beginning in April 1917, Japan, an ally of Great Britain, sent a total of 14 destroyers to the Mediterranean with cruiser flagships which were based at Malta and played an important part in escorting convoys to guard them against enemy submarines. The Japanese ships were effective in patrol and anti-submarine activity. However, of the nine Austro-Hungarian navy submarines lost to enemy action, five were sunk by Italian navy units (U-13, U-10, U-16, U-20, and U-23), one by Italian and French units (U-30), one by Royal Navy units (U-3), while none were sunk by the Japanese navy, which lost one destroyer (Sakaki, torpedoed by U-27).

=== 1918: Final stages ===
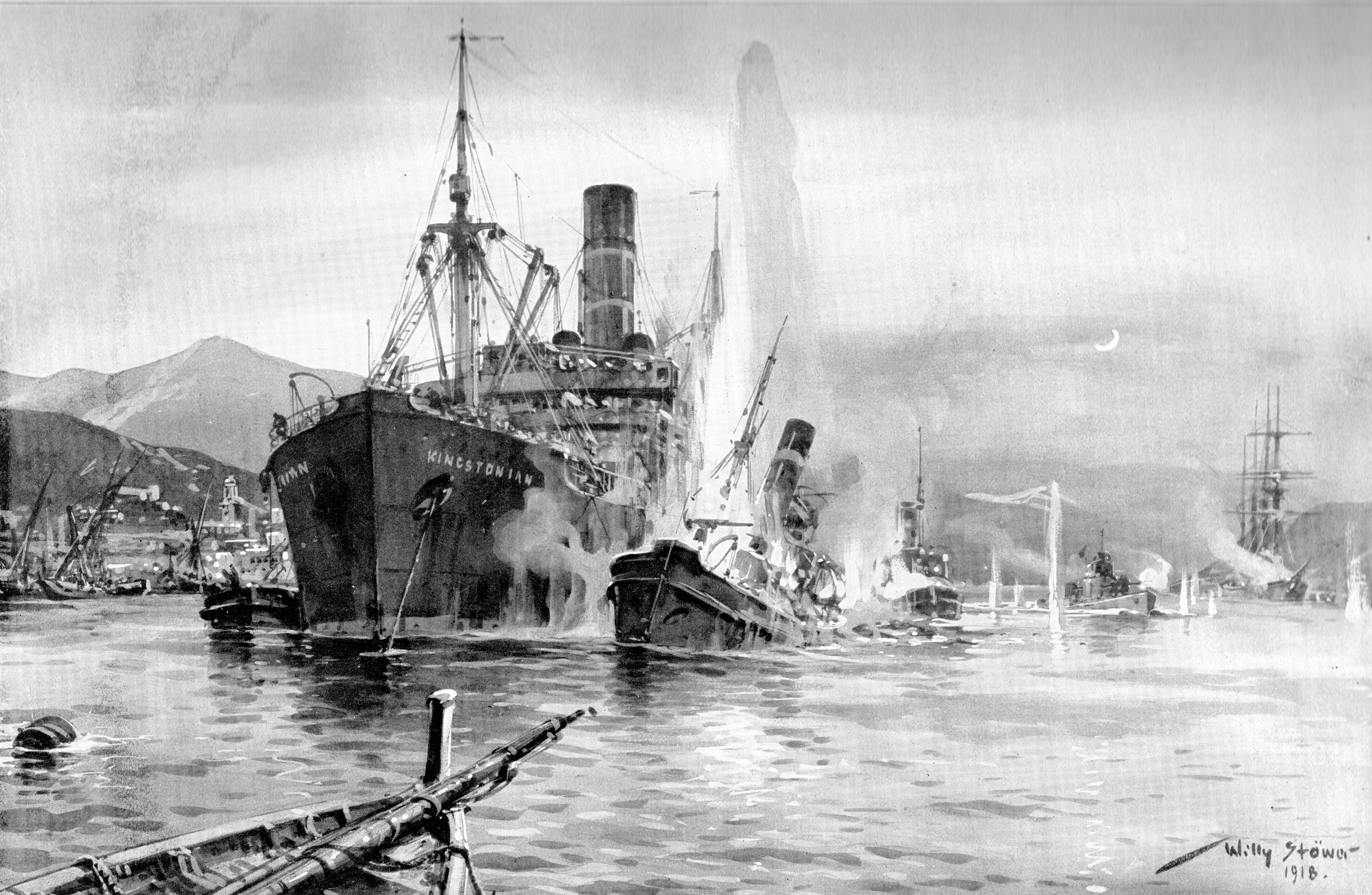
SM UB-48 under Lieutenant Commander Wolfgang Steinbauer (1888–1978) penetrates the Italian port of Carloforte on 29 April 1918 and destroys the British steamer KINGSTONIAN, two British salvage steamers and a French bark

Although convoys had been introduced between Malta and Alexandria in May 1917, the Allies were unable to introduce a comprehensive system until later in the year. The number of routes, and divided responsibilities, made this complicated, while a continued belief in offensive measures, such as the Otranto Barrage, kept up a shortage of escort ships elsewhere. Throughout the year U-boats were still able to find and sink ships sailing independently. By 1918, however, the U-boats' successes began to drop. In January 1918, German U-boats sank 103,738 long tons (105,403 t) and the Austrians sank a further 20,020 long tons (20,340 t) while two Pola boats were sunk.

Allied losses continued to fall during the year, while U-boat losses mounted. In May 1918, Allied losses dropped below 100,000 long tons (100,000 t) and did not rise above this again, while the Pola Flotilla lost four boats, its worst month of the war.

Karl Dönitz, who would go on to command the German U-boat force in World War II, was commander of UB-68, operating in the Mediterranean. On 4 October, this boat was sunk by British forces and Dönitz was taken prisoner on the island of Malta.

By October 1918, the end of the campaign, Allied losses for the year stood at 761,000 long tons (773,000 t). The Pola Flotilla had lost 11 boats, and the KuK a further 3. In October, the Central Powers were on the verge of collapse; Bulgaria and the Ottomans had sued for peace, and the Austrians were about to do the same. The Germans elected to abandon the Mediterranean; nine U-boats sailed from their bases on the Adriatic to return to Germany and a further ten boats were scuttled. Two ships—Mercia and Surada—were torpedoed on the way, the last Allied ships to be sunk in the Mediterranean, and three U-boats were attacked. U-35 was damaged and forced to run for Barcelona, where she was interned; U-34 was destroyed. The last action of the Mediterranean force came on 9 November 1918, just two days before the armistice: UB-50 torpedoed and sank the British battleship HMS Britannia off Cape Trafalgar.

== Bases and areas of operations ==
Most of the German (and all of the Austro-Hungarian) U-boats operated out of the Adriatic, with their main base at Cattaro. Another German U-boat base was located at Constantinople in the Ottoman Empire. The U-boats also laid minefields, spread between such different locations like outside Toulon, France, to near Alexandria, Egypt.

== Table ==
Date	Ships sunk (KuK)	Tonnage	Ships sunk (Pola)	Tonnage	U-boats destroyed (KuK)	U-boats destroyed (Pola)
1914	?		n/a	n/a	none	n/a
1915	?		102	350,853	2	none
1916	?		415	1,045,058	2	1
1917	?		(not recorded)	1,514,050	1	2
1918	?		325	761,060	3	10

== See also ==
- Adriatic Campaign of World War I
- Gallipoli Campaign
- U-boat Campaign (World War I)
