= Società Nazionale Officine di Savigliano =

Italian industrial company

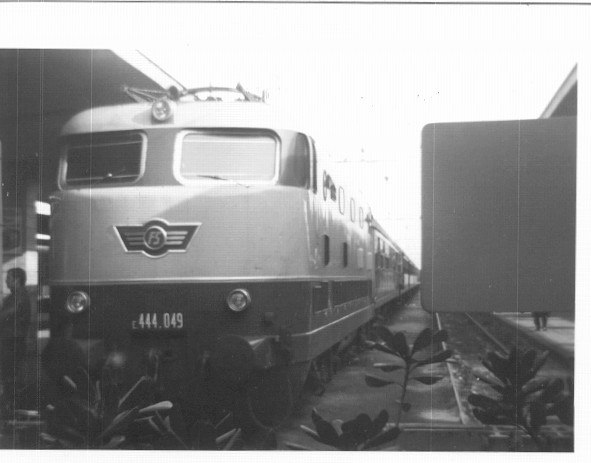
FS Class E.444 at Naples

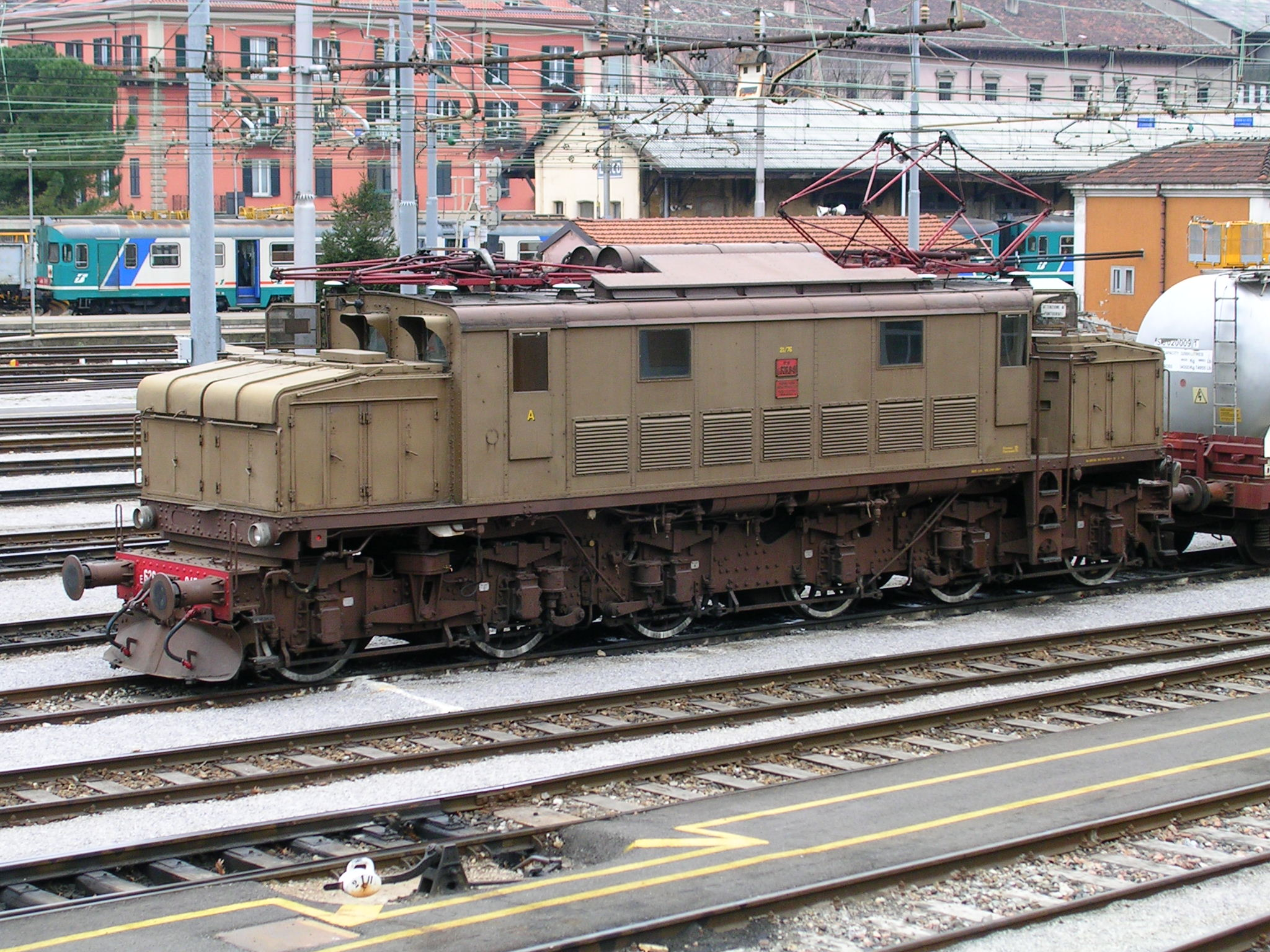
FS Class E.626 at Lecco

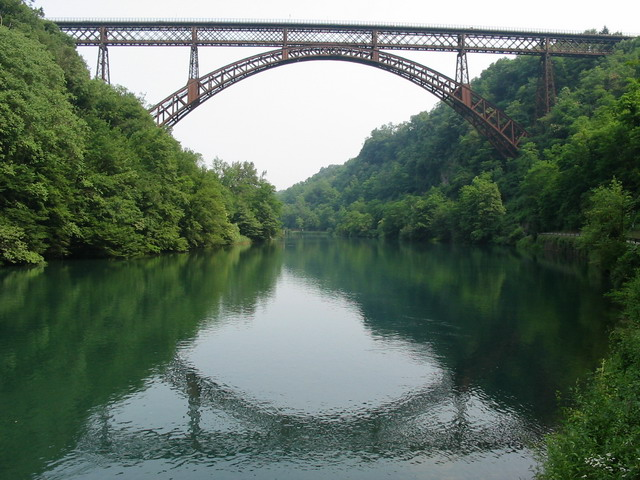
Ponte di ferro di Paderno d'Adda

Società Nazionale Officine di Savigliano (SNOS), also known as Savigliano, was one of the most prestigious Italian industrial companies of the twentieth century. It had interests in many sectors including mechanical and electrical engineering. It was founded in Turin on 17 July 1880, with a share capital of one million lire, with the aim of undertaking the "construction and repair of railway material, metal bridges, canopies, mechanical, electrical and aeronautical constructions as well as woodworking. generally".

== History ==
The origins of Savigliano are intertwined with those of one of the first Piedmontese railway companies, the Società della Ferrovia Torino-Cuneo, which had built a workshop for the maintenance and repair of its rolling stock next to Savigliano station. In 1869, with the transfer of ownership of the line to the Società per le Ferrovie dell'Alta Italia (SFAI), the workshop was closed. On 14 December 1879, the municipality of Savigliano signed a memorandum of understanding with the SFAI, pledging to pay a considerable sum of money, and rented the abandoned workshop of the Turin-Cuneo railway to a Belgian company building railway material, enabling it to resume activity.

== Production ==
On 17 July 1880 the Società Nazionale Officine di Savigliano was founded in Turin, with headquarters in Savigliano, which rapidly expanded to take on 640 employees and make a monthly production of over fifty rolling stock units commissioned by various railway companies such as SFAI, Ferrovie Romane and Compagnie Internationale des Wagons-Lits. The elegant sleeping cars produced for the latter were presented at the Turin Exhibition in 1884. In 1889, SNOS merged with the Società Anonima Italiana Ausiliare, a Turin-based company competing with the related facilities located in Corso Mortara near Torino Dora station. This led to a further expansion of production that, on the threshold of the First World War, also embraced electrical and mechanical machinery as well as metal constructions such as bridges and viaducts in many foreign countries. The period between 1915 and 1918 saw Savigliano strongly engaged in war production with activities in the nascent aeronautical sector, war equipment, cannons and ammunition.

The post-war period saw the SNOS engaged in extensive production of large metal structures such as the roof of the new Milan Central station, electromechanical cranes for the major Italian ports and electric locomotives for both three-phase alternating current and direct current. The Ethiopian campaign had seen it strongly involved both in war production and in the construction of infrastructure of all kinds but, in the Second World War there was greater involvement in sectors such as radio and telephone field transmissions. Like other large industries, Savigliano's plants had suffered war damage but, by 1948, it had resumed supplies to the State Railways that were commissioning the production of rolling stock of all kinds.

== Takeover by Fiat ==
Soon afterwards, Fiat took a shareholding in the company and this gradually increased until FIAT had total corporate control. In 1970, the plants in Turin and Savigliano were separated, the latter becoming Fiat Ferroviaria Savigliano. Savigliano was then taken over by a group of large electromechanical companies, including General Electric, Ercole Marelli and Ansaldo. In the 1980s, Savigliano became a leader in the electromechanical sector in Italy and the Mediterranean. After other changes of ownership at the end of the twentieth century it becomes Savigliano SpA and this was followed by divestments and downsizing.

== High-speed trains ==
Among the most prestigious constructions of the Savigliano railway plant were the prototypes E.444.001-004, the first high-speed electric locomotives of the Ferrovie dello Stato, delivered between 1967 and 1968 with the Savigliano brand, and the electric train ETR.401, progenitor of the Pendolino tilting train family, delivered in 1976 with the FIAT Ferroviaria Savigliano brand following the spin-off from SNOS. On 1 August 2000, the prestigious plant was sold to Alstom and this marked the final exit of FIAT from the railway sector.

== Other notable projects ==
- 1887-1889: Paderno bridge
- 1883: Bridge over the Villoresi canal - road
- 1887: Casalmaggiore railway bridge (Brescia - Parma line)
- 1892: Bridge on the Po of Cremona - road and rail
- 1895: Ponte del Ciadel, Borgo San Dalmazzo
- 1916: Ponte della Gerola (Casei Gerola - Sannazzaro de 'Burgondi road)
- 1916: Ponte di Zimella
- 1917: Biplane C.36
- 1925-1928: Ronciglione bridge
- 1926: FS Class E.626 locomotive prototypes
- 1927-1939: E.626 locomotives
- 1950: Ponte della Becca

== Later history ==
The workshop buildings of the Società Nazionale Officine di Savigliano in Turin's northern outskirts have been transformed into the SNOS shopping mall and office space for Seat Pagine Gialle. In 2021, the SNOS workshops on Corso Mortara in Turin were reopened as a leisure and shopping space.
