= Italian destroyer Giuseppe Cesare Abba =

Italian Rosolino Pilo-class destroyer

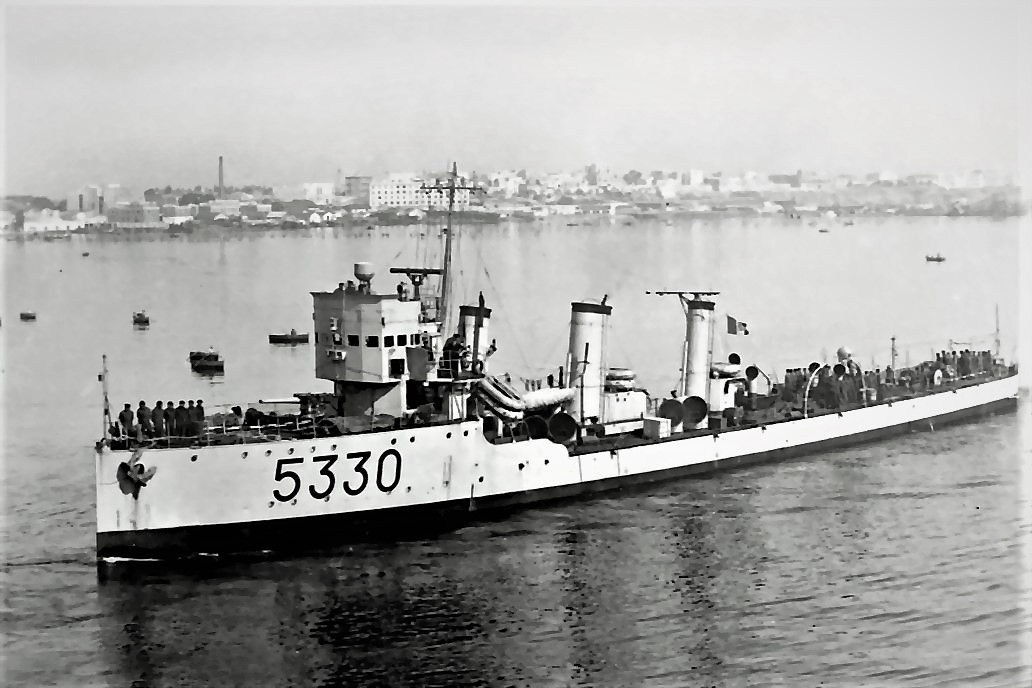
- Giuseppe Cesare Abba as a minesweeper. The photo is dated 1 July 1953, but she already bears the pennant number M5330 given to her in 1954.

History

Kingdom of Italy
- Name: Giuseppe Cesare Abba
- Namesake: Giuseppe Cesare Abba (1838–1910), Italian patriot
- Builder: Cantieri navali Odero, Sestri Ponente, Kingdom of Italy
- Laid down: 19 August 1913
- Launched: 25 May 1915
- Commissioned: 6 July 1915
- Reclassified: Torpedo boat 1 October 1929
- Identification: Pennant number AB
- Fate: To Italian Republic 1946

Italian Republic
- Reclassified: Coastal minesweeper 1954
- Stricken: 1 September 1958
- Identification: Pennant number AB (1946–1954); Pennant number M 5330 (1954–1958)
- Fate: Scrapped

General characteristics
- Class & type: Rosolino Pilo-class destroyer
- Displacement: 912 tons (max); 770 tons (standard)
- Length: 73 m (240 ft)
- Beam: 7.3 m (24 ft)
- Draught: 2.3 m (7 ft 7 in)
- Installed power: 16,000 brake horsepower (11,931 kW)
- Propulsion: 1 × Tosi steam turbines; 4 × Thornycroft boilers
- Speed: 30 knots (56 km/h; 35 mph)
- Range: 1,200 nmi (2,200 km; 1,400 mi) at 14 knots (26 km/h; 16 mph)
- Complement: 69-79
- Armament: 1915–1918: 4 × 1 Cannon 76/40 Model 1916; 2 × 1 76mm/30 AA; 4 × 1 450 mm (17.7 in) torpedo tubes; 10 mines; 1919–1921: 5 × 1 102 mm (4.0 in)/35 guns; 2 × 1 - 40 mm/39 AA; 2 x 1 65-millimetre (2.6 in) machine guns; 4 × 1 450 mm (17.7 in) torpedo tubes

Giuseppe Cesare Abba was an Italian Rosolino Pilo-class destroyer. Commissioned into service in the Italian Regia Marina (Royal Navy) in 1915, she served in World War I, playing an active role in the Adriatic campaign. Reclassified as a torpedo boat in 1929, she participated in the Mediterranean and Adriatic campaigns of World War II. In 1943, she switched to the Allied side, operating as part of the Italian Co-belligerent Navy for the remainder of the war. She served in the postwar Italian Navy (Marina Miltare) and was reclassified as a minesweeper in 1954. She was stricken in 1958.

== Construction and commissioning ==
Giuseppe Cesare Abba was laid down at the Cantieri navali Odero (English: Odero Shipyard) in Sestri Ponente, Italy, on 19 August 1913. She was launched on 25 May 1915 and completed and commissioned on 6 July 1915.

== Service history ==
=== World War I ===
==== 1915 ====
World War I broke out in 1914, and the Kingdom of Italy entered the war on the side of the Allies with its declaration of war on Austria-Hungary on 23 May 1915. Giuseppe Cesare Abba was commissioned just over seven weeks after Italy declared war. On the night of 12–13 August 1915, Giuseppe Cesare Abba, serving as flagship of her squadron, got underway with her sister ship Antonio Mosto and the French Navy destroyer Bisson to search for the Austro-Hungarian Navy submarine U-3, which had made an unsuccessful attack on the Italian auxiliary cruiser Città di Catania in the Adriatic Sea east of Brindisi, Italy. Arranged in a radial pattern, the three destroyers first followed the route between the point of the attack and the Austro-Hungarian Navy base at Cattaro, then zigzagged in a northerly direction, and then headed south. At 04:52 on 13 August, Bisson sighted U-3 — which had suffered a mechanical breakdown – on the surface and sank her with gunfire. Giuseppe Cesare Abba rushed to the scene upon receiving the report of the sighting, arriving in time to see U-3 sink.

On the afternoon of 6 December 1915, Giuseppe Cesare Abba, the protected cruiser Quarto, the scout cruiser Guglielmo Pepe, the auxiliary cruiser Città di Catania, the minelayers Minerva and Partenope, and the destroyers Borea, Francesco Nullo, and Ippolito Nievo departed Taranto, Italy, to escort a convoy to Vlorë (known to the Italians as Valona) in the Principality of Albania. The convoy — made up of the troopships America, Cordova, Dante Alighieri, and Indiana — carried 400 officers, 6,300 non-commissioned officers and soldiers, and 1,200 draft animals. The convoy reached Vlorë at 08:00 on 7 December 1915.

At approximately 09:00 on 29 December 1915 Giuseppe Cesare Abba and other destroyers departed Brindisi with the protected cruiser Nino Bixio and the British Royal Navy light cruiser HMS Weymouth to join other formations of Allied warships in pursuing an Austro-Hungarian force composed of the scout cruiser Helgoland and the destroyers Balaton, Csepel, Lika, Tátra, and Triglav, which had bombarded the harbor at Durrës (known to the Italians as Durazzo) on the coast of Albania, sinking the Greek steamer Mikael and two sailing ships while losing Lika, which struck a mine. Giuseppe Cesare Abba did not play a significant role in the subsequent clash, known as the First Battle of Durazzo, in which Helgoland and British and French cruisers suffered minor damage and French destroyers sank Triglav.

==== 1916 ====
On the night of 25–26 June 1916, while the protected cruiser Marsala and the destroyers Audace, Impavido, Insidioso, and Irrequieto operated in distant support, Giuseppe Cesare Abba and the destroyers Antonio Mosto, Pilade Bronzetti, and Rosolino Pilo escorted the coastal torpedo boats 34 PN and 36 PN as 34 PN and 36 PN towed the motor torpedo boats MAS 5 and MAS 7 to a point 2.5 nautical miles (4.6 km; 2.9 mi) off Durrës. MAS 5 and MAS 7 then dropped their tow cables at 00:15 on 26 June and raided the harbor at Durrës, launching torpedoes at 01:45 and rejoining Giuseppe Cesare Abba′s formation at 02:40. The attack resulted in serious damage to the 1,111-gross register ton steamship Sarajevo, and all the Italian ships returned to base safely.

On 3 August 1916 Giuseppe Cesare Abba, under the command of Capitano di fregata (Frigate Captain) Petrelluzzi, got underway with the destroyer Ardente to support an attack by nine aircraft against Durrës, but during their voyage to the Albanian coast the two ships were diverted to Molfetta, Italy, which had come under bombardment by an Austro-Hungarian force composed of the protected cruiser Aspern, the destroyers Warasdiner and Wildfang, and the torpedo boats TB 80 and TB 85. Ardente suffered a mechanical breakdown and had to fall back to join a French destroyer squadron led by the destroyer Commandant Bory, which was coming up to reinforce the Italian ships. Meanwhile Giuseppe Cesare Abba continued alone even after sighting the Austro-Hungarian submarine U-20 at 08:20. She sighted the Austro-Hungarian ships at 09:00 and tried to close with them to open fire, but the much larger and better-armed Aspern thwarted Giuseppe Cesare Abba by placing herself between the Italian ship and the Austro-Hungarian torpedo boats. The French destroyer squadron arrived on the scene and joined the pursuit, but the Allied ships gave up the chase when the Austro-Hungarian ships reached a point only 16 nautical miles (30 km; 18 mi) from Cattaro.

During the night of 3–4 November 1916 Giuseppe Cesare Abba, Ippolito Nievo, and Rosolino Pilo escorted 34 PN and the coastal torpedo boats 35 PN and 37 PN as they towed the motor torpedo boats MAS 6 and MAS 7 for another attack on Durrës, which failed because of the presence of torpedo nets in the harbor.

At 23:00 on 22 December 1916 Giuseppe Cesare Abba, Ippolito Nievo, and Rosolino Pilo got underway from Brindisi and headed for Cape Rodoni to intercept the Austro-Hungarian destroyers Dinara, Reka, Scharfschutze, and Velebit, which had attacked the Otranto Barrage in the Strait of Otranto and were returning to Cattaro after a clash with the French Navy destroyers Boutefeu, Casque, Commandant Bory, Commandant Rivière, Dehorter, and Protet. The Italian destroyers did not find the Austro-Hungarian ships, but did encounter the French destroyers. The two groups of Allied ships were unable to coordinate their maneuvers and confusion ensued. At 01:40 on 23 December Giuseppe Cesare Abba sighted smoke on her port bow and turned north to investigate, accelerating to full speed. After recognizing Dehorter and Protet, she sighted Casque approachng her, but too late to avoid a collision, although neither Giuseppe Cesare Abba or Casque suffered serious damage. Giuseppe Cesare Abba backed away from Casque after the collision and was maneuvering in reverse when Boutefeu, which had narrowly avoided collisions with Ippolito Nievo and Rosolino Pilo, rammed Giuseppe Cesare Abba, killing a man who went missing. Again the damage was not serious, and all three damaged destroyers returned to port.

==== 1917 ====
On 11 May 1917 Giuseppe Cesare Abba got underway from Venice with Ardente, the destroyers Animoso and Ardito, and the new destroyer Audace to intercept an Austro-Hungarian Navy force consisting of the destroyer Csikos and the torpedo boats 78 T, 93 T, and 96 T. They sighted the Austro-Hungarian ships at 15:30 at a range of about 10,000 meters (10,900 yd) but were unable to engage the Austro-Hungarian ships before they escaped behind the protection of a minefield near the major Austro-Hungarian Navy base at Pola, and after approaching Pola the Italian ships gave up the chase and returned to Venice.

On the night of 13–14 August 1917 Giuseppe Cesare Abba left Venice with Animoso, Ardente, Audace, and the destroyers Carabiniere, Francesco Stocco, Giovanni Acerbi, Giuseppe Sirtori, Pontiere, and Vincenzo Giordano Orsini to intercept an Austro-Hungarian force made up of the destroyers Dinara, Reka, Sharfschutze, Streiter, and Velebit and six torpedo boats which had supported an air raid by 32 aircraft against the fortress of Venice which had struck San Giovanni e Paolo Hospital, killing 14 people and injuring around 30 others. Only Vincenzo Giordano Orsini managed to make brief and fleeting contact with the Austro-Hungarian ships before they escaped.

On 29 September 1917 Giuseppe Cesare Abba put to sea with Francesco Stocco, Giovanni Acerbi, Vincenzo Giordano Orsini, the scout cruiser Sparviero and a second formation made up of Ardente, Ardito and Audace to support a bombing raid by 10 Italian airplanes against Pola. They encountered an Austro-Hungarian force composed of Streiter, Velebit, the destroyers Huszár and Turul, and four torpedo boats on a similar mission against an Italian airbase. The Italians opened fire just before midnight at a range of 3,000 metres (3,300 yards), but received the worst of the initial exchange as the Austro-Hungarians concentrated their fire on the leading ship, Sparviero. Sparviero was hit five times, but only three men were wounded, and one Italian destroyer was hit. As the Austro-Hungarians retreated towards the shelter of their minefields, the Italians crippled Velebit and set her on fire. Another Austro-Hungarian destroyer took her in tow and both sides returned to port after an inconclusive exchange of fire inside the minefields later that night during the predawn hours of 30 September.

On 16 November 1917 Giuseppe Cesare Abba, Animoso, Ardente, Audace, Francesco Stocco, Giovanni Acerbi, and Vincenzo Giordano Orsini got underway to respond to a bombardment carried out by the Austro-Hungarian coastal defense ships Wien and Budapest against Italian artillery batteries and other coastal defenses at Cortellazzo, near the mouth of the Piave River. The destroyers supported an attack by the Italian motor torpedo boats MAS 13 and MAS 15 which, together with attacks by Italian aircraft and the Italian submarines F11 and F13, disrupted the bombardment and forced the two Austro-Hungarian ships to withdraw. On 18 November 1917 Giuseppe Cesare Abba, Animoso, Ardente, and Audace bombarded the Austrian-Hungarian lines on the Italian front between Caorle and Revedoli.

On 28 November 1917, an Austro-Hungarian Navy force consisting of Dinara, Huszar, Reka, Streiter, the destroyers Dikla and Triglav, and the torpedo boats TB 78, TB 79, TB 86, and TB 90 attacked the Italian coast. While Dikla, Huszar, Streiter and the torpedo boats unsuccessfully attacked first Porto Corsini and then Rimini, Dinara, Reka, and Triglav bombarded a railway near the mouth of the Metauro, damaging a train, the railway tracks, and telegraph lines. The Austro-Hungarian ships then reunited and headed back to the main Austro-Hungarian naval base at Pola. Giuseppe Cesare Abba, Animoso, Ardente, Ardito, Audace, Francesco Stocco, Giovanni Acerbi, Giuseppe Sirtori, Sparviero, Vincenzo Giordano Orsini, and the scout cruiser Aquila departed Venice and, together with reconnaissance seaplanes, pursued the Austro-Hungarian formation. The seaplanes attacked the Austro-Hungarians without success, and the Italian ships had to give up the chase when they did not sight the Austro-Hungarians until they neared Cape Promontore on the southern coast of Istria, as continuing beyond it would bring them too close to Pola.

==== 1918 ====
On 10 February 1918, Giuseppe Cesare Abba, Animoso, and Audace departed Venice to participate in a raid on Bakar (known to the Italians as Buccari) on the coast of Austria-Hungary. While Ardente, Ardito, Francesco Stocco, Giovanni Acerbi, Giuseppe Sirtori, and the scout cruiser Aquila stood by at Porto Levante in case they needed to support the operation, Giuseppe Cesare Abba, Animoso, and Audace towed the motor torpedo boats MAS 94, MAS 95, and MAS 96 to the pre-established "Point O," 20 nautical miles (37 km; 23 mi) east of Sansego, where they passed their tow cables to the coastal torpedo boats 12 PN, 13 PN, and 18 PN, then cruised 50 nautical miles (93 km; 58 mi) off Ancona while the coastal torpedo boats towed the MAS boats closer to the coast and the MAS boats carried out the raid. The results of the raid — damage to one steamer — were militarily insignificant, but the raid was of great propaganda value in Italy, where it was celebrated widely as the "Bakar mockery" (Beffa di Buccari), aspects of which the Italian nationalist poet Gabriele D'Annunzio, who took part in the raid, orchestrated.

By late October 1918, Austria-Hungary had effectively disintegrated, and the Armistice of Villa Giusti, signed on 3 November 1918, went into effect on 4 November 1918 and brought hostilities between Austria-Hungary and the Allies to an end. At 18:10 on 3 November Giuseppe Cesare Abba, under the command of an officer named Portaluppi, and the coastal torpedo boats 65 PN and 66 PN arrived at Poreč (known to the Italians as Parenzo), where the local, mostly Italian population welcomed their crews enthusiastically. After occupying the city and disarming its former Austro-Hungarian fortifications, the three ships departed on 4 November. On 5 November 1918, Giuseppe Cesare Abba, Rosolino Pilo, the battleship Ammiraglio di Saint Bon, and the destroyers Giuseppe La Masa and Giuseppe Missori entered the port at Pola, the site of an important Austro-Hungarian Navy base, after which units embarked on the ships occupied the city over the following days. World War I ended with an armistice between the Allies and the German Empire on 11 November 1918.

=== Interwar period ===
At the end of November 1918 Giuseppe Cesare Abba escorted two steamers loaded with Austrian, German, and Polish soldiers from Fiume to Venice. Not long afterward, her armament was revised, giving her five 102-millimetre (4 in)/35-caliber guns, two 40-millimetre (1.6 in)/35-caliber guns, and four 450-millimetre (17.7 in) torpedo tubes, and, according to some sources, two 65-millimetre (2.6 in) machine guns. Her full-load displacement rose to 900 tonnes (886 long tons).

On the morning of 6 August 1928 Giuseppe Cesare Abba, serving as flagship of the 5th Destroyer Flotilla, got underway from Poreč (Parenzo) to take part with numerous other ships in an exercise in the Adriatic Sea. Plans called for the flotilla to escort the light cruiser Brindisi and scout cruiser Aquila while they cruised from Poreč to Pola and back and included a simulated attack on the formation by the submarines F14 and F15. At 08:40, under clear skies, with rough seas and rising winds, Giuseppe Cesare Abba sighted F14′s periscope only a few meters off her starboard beam, and signaled "submarine to starboard abeam" to the other ships, making no mention of the F14′s proximity to her. Her signal prompted the crew of Giuseppe Missori, a short distance astern of Giuseppe Cesare Abba, to focus attention to starboard of their ship, the apparent direction of the expected simulated attack, rather than ahead, where F14 had been sighted just abeam of Giuseppe Cesare Abba. By the time Giuseppe Missori′s crew sighted F14 ahead of their ship, the two vessels were only 160 to 180 metres (170 to 200 yd) apart. Both Giuseppe Missori and F14 took evasive action, but too late to avoid a collision, and Giuseppe Missori rammed F14. F14 sank quickly 7 nautical miles (13 km; 8.1 mi) west of the Brijuni archipelago. Efforts to rescue men trapped aboard the wreck of F14 failed, and they eventually died of asphyxiation by carbon dioxide and chlorine gas.

Giuseppe Cesare Abba was reclassified as a torpedo boat on 1 October 1929.

=== World War II ===
==== 1940–1942 ====
World War II broke out in September 1939 with Nazi Germany's invasion of Poland. Italy joined the war on the side of the Axis powers with its invasion of France on 10 June 1940. At the time, Giuseppe Cesare Abba was part of the 5th Torpedo Boat Squadron, along with the torpedo boats Albatros, Giuseppe Dezza, Giuseppe La Farina, and Simone Schiaffino. During the war, she mainly served as an escort, initially operating in the southern Tyrrhenian Sea.

In July 1940,Giuseppe Cesare Abba took part in Operation TCM, the escort of the first large convoy from Italy to Libya, consisting of the troopships Calitea, with 619 soldiers aboard, and Esperia, carrying 1,571 troops, and the modern cargo ships Francesco Barbaro, Marco Foscarini, and Vettor Pisani, whose combined cargo consisted of 232 vehicles, 5,720 tonnes (5,630 long tons; 6,305 short tons) of fuels and lubricants, and 10,445 tonnes (10,280 long tons; 11,514 short tons) of other materials. After the rest of the convoy got underway from Naples at 19:45 on 6 July, Giuseppe Cesare Abba and her sister ship Rosolino Pilo left Catania on 7 July escorting Francesco Barbaro. After rendezvousing with the rest of the convoy, Giuseppe Cesare Abba and Rosolino Pilo became part of the direct escort along with the 14th Torpedo Boat Squadron, consisting of the torpedo boats Orione, Orsa, Pegaso, and Procione. With the light cruisers Giovanni dalle Bande Nere and Bartolomeo Colleoni and the destroyers Grecale, Libeccio, Maestrale, and Scirocco in distant support, the convoy arrived safely at Benghazi, Libya, on 8 July.

On 2 and 3 September 1940 Giuseppe Cesare Abba escorted the troopships Città di Livorno and Priaruggia along the Libyan coast from Tobruk to Benghazi.

Giuseppe Cesare Abba was at Vlorë on the coast of the Italian Protectorate of Albania on 16 March 1941 when at sunset she received orders to moor in the Bay of Vlorë east of the Karaburun Peninsula. Six merchant ships were moored in this area, and at 18:30 Giueppe Cesare Abba and the torpedo boat Andromeda anchored at predetermined points, Giuseppe Cesare Abba at the northern end of the line of ships and Andromeda at the opposite end. The two torpedo boats kept their boilers lit so that they could get underway quickly if necessary, and made ready to protect the merchant ships with anti-aircraft fire. To the east of the group the tanker and landing ship Sesia and the large fishing vessel Genepesca Seconda were moored, ready to perform rescue operations if any ship was hit. At 23:50 a lookout location at Derni sighted a flight of six British Royal Navy Fleet Air Arm Fairey Swordfish torpedo bombers approaching the harbor to attack the ships, and at 23:58 a listening station at Sazan (known to the Italians as Saseno) also detected them. Antiaircraft artillery ashore opened fire, then ceased fire as Italian fighter aircraft entered the area. At midnight the British planes arrived at the Bay of Vlorë, and Giuseppe Cesarae Abba and Andromeda, hearing their engines, opened fire on them. One Swordfish dropped its torpedo 400 metres (440 yd) from Andromeda and hit her. Andromeda′s boilers exploded, and she sank quickly at 40°21′N 019°28′E with the loss of 50 of her crew of 137.

On the night of 18–19 May 1942, Giuseppe Cesare Abba departed Augusta, Sicily, and escorted the motor torpedo boats MAS 451, MAS 452, MTSM 214, and MTSM 218 to Malta, where they disembarked the Maltese irredentist, National Fascist Party member, and Maritime Artillery Militia sottotenente (sublieutenant) Carmelo Borg Pisani, who was supposed to gather information to help in preparation for Operation Herkules, a planned Italian-German amphibious landing on the island. The British garrison captured Borg Pisani after he had been ashore for only two days, and he was hanged for treason and conspiracy on 28 November 1942.

On 9 November 1942 Giuseppe Cesare Abbe and the torpedo boats Cigno and Lince escorted the crippled light cruiser Attilio Regolo, which was returning to port under tow by the tug Polifemo after the British submarine HMS Unruffled torpedoed her in the southern Tyrrhenian Sea off Capo San Vito Siculo on the northwestern end of Sicily at 38°14′N 012°41′E, blowing off her bow. During the voyage the British submarine HMS United made an unsuccessful attack on Attilio Regolo, which eventually reached port.

==== 1943–1945 ====
In 1943 Giuseppe Cesare Abba was assigned to the 3rd Torpedo Boat Group in the Ionian and Lower Adriatic Maritime Military Department along with Francesco Stocco, Giuseppe Dezza, Giuseppe Missori, Giuseppe Sirtori, and the torpedo boat Enrico Cosenz.

On 8 September 1943, the Kingdom of Italy announced an armistice with the Allies and switched sides in the war, prompting Nazi Germany to begin Operation Achse, the disarmament by force of the Italian armed forces and the occupation of those portions of Italy not yet under Allied control. At the time, Giuseppe Cesare Abba was part of the 3rd Torpedo Boat Group, with an operating area in the southern Adriatic Sea. Avoiding capture by the Germans, she embarked troops of the Italian 155th Infantry Division "Emilia" — who were being evacuated from Montenegro — at Kotor on 15 September 1943.

Giuseppe Cesare Abba subsequently fought on the Allied side as a unit of the Italian Co-belligerent Navy through the end of the war in Europe in May 1945. She operated in a variety of roles, including towing targets.

=== Post-World War II ===
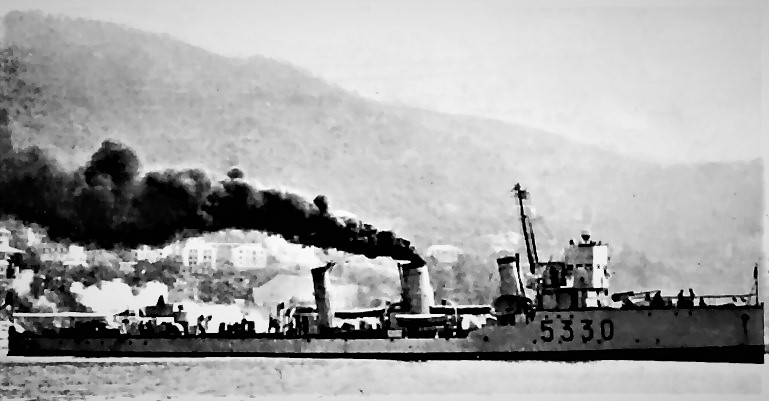
Giuseppe Cesare Abba as a coastal minesweeper in the 1950s

Giuseppe Cesare Abba remained in service after World War II, as a unit of the Regia Marina until the Italian monarchy was abolished in 1946 and then as part of the Italian Navy (Marina Militare) under the Italian Republic. She was reclassified as a coastal minesweeper in 1954 and given the new pennant number M 5330. She was stricken from the naval register on 1 September 1958 and subsequently scrapped.
