= Italian destroyer Giuseppe Missori =

Italian Rosolino Pilo-class destroyer

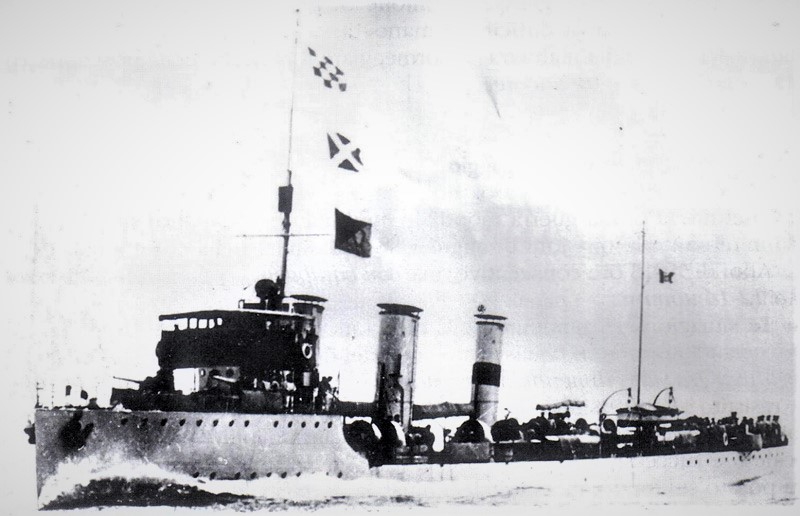

History

Kingdom of Italy
- Name: Giuseppe Missori
- Namesake: Giuseppe Missori (1829–1911), Italian soldier
- Builder: Cantieri navali Odero, Sestri Ponente, Kingdom of Italy
- Laid down: 19 January 1914
- Launched: 20 December 1915
- Completed: 7 March 1916
- Commissioned: 7 March 1916
- Reclassified: Torpedo boat 1 October 1929
- Identification: Pennant number MS (1922–1943)
- Fate: Captured by Nazi Germany 10 September 1943

Nazi Germany
- Name: TA22
- Acquired: 10 September 1943
- Fate: Laid up 11 August 1944; Scuttled 3 May 1945; Refloated 1949; Scrapped

General characteristics
- Class & type: Rosolino Pilo-class destroyer
- Displacement: 912 tons (max); 770 tons (standard)
- Length: 73 m (240 ft)
- Beam: 7.3 m (24 ft)
- Draught: 2.3 m (7 ft 7 in)
- Installed power: 16,000 brake horsepower (11,931 kW)
- Propulsion: 1 × Tosi steam turbines; 4 × Thornycroft boilers
- Speed: 30 knots (56 km/h; 35 mph)
- Range: 1,200 nmi (2,200 km; 1,400 mi) at 14 knots (26 km/h; 16 mph)
- Complement: 69-79
- Armament: 1915–1918: 4 × 1 Cannon 76/40 Model 1916; 2 × 1 76mm/30 AA; 4 × 1 450 mm (17.7 in) torpedo tubes; 10 mines; 1919–1921: 5 × 1 102 mm (4.0 in)/35 guns; 2 × 1 - 40 mm/39 AA; 2 x 1 65-millimetre (2.6 in) machine guns; 4 × 1 450 mm (17.7 in) torpedo tubes

Giuseppe Missori was an Italian Rosolino Pilo-class destroyer. Commissioned into service in the Italian Regia Marina (Royal Navy) in 1916, she served in World War I, playing an active role in the Adriatic campaign. Reclassified as a torpedo boat in 1929, she participated in the Mediterranean campaign and Adriatic campaign of World War II until the Italian armistice with the Allies, prompting Nazi Germany to capture her. Subsequently operating in the Kriegsmarine as TA22, she participated in the Adriatic campaign until she was seriously damaged in 1944. She sank in May 1945.

== Construction and commissioning ==
Giuseppe Missori was laid down at the Cantieri navali Odero (English: Odero Shipyard) in Sestri Ponente, Italy, on 19 January 1914. She was launched on 20 December 1915 and completed and commissioned on 7 March 1916.

== Service history ==
=== World War I ===
==== 1916 ====
World War I was raging when Giuseppe Missori entered service. On 3 May 1916 Giuseppe Missori, under the command of Capitano di corvetta (Corvette Captain) Ferrero, got underway with her sister ship Francesco Nullo and the scout cruisers Cesare Rossarol and Guglielmo Pepe to provide distant support to the destroyers Fuciliere and Zeffiro as they laid a minefield in the Adriatic Sea off Šibenik (known to the Italians as Sebenico) on the coast of Austria-Hungary. Off Punta Maestra, the Italian formation sighted four Austro-Hungarian Navy Huszár-class destroyers and six Austro-Hungarian torpedo boats and steered to attack them. While the Austro-Hungarian ships headed toward the Austro-Hungarian naval base at Pola with the Italians in pursuit, three Austro-Hungarian seaplanes attacked the Italian ships. The Italians repelled the attack, but at 15:50, after an Austro-Hungarian cruiser and two additional Austro-Hungarian torpedo boats departed Pola to support the Austro-Hungarian ships, the Italian force gave up the chase and withdrew. Meanwhile, Fuciliere and Zeffiro succeeded in laying the minefield during the night of 3–4 May 1916.

On 12 June 1916, escorted by Cesare Rossarol and Guglielmo Pepe as far as the Austro-Hungarian defensive barrage, Giuseppe Missori and Francesco Nullo supported Fuciliere, Zeffiro, the destroyer Alpino, and the coastal torpedo boats 30 PN and 46 PN as they forced the port of Poreč (known to the Italians as Parenzo) on the western side of Istria, a peninsula on Austria-Hungary's coast, at dawn. On 1–2 November 1916, Giuseppe Missori, Francesco Nullo, Guglielmo Pepe, and the scout cruiser Alessandro Poerio made ready to provide possible support to an incursion by MAS motor torpedo boats into the Fasana Channel on the southwest coast of Istria.

==== 1917–1918 ====
An Austro-Hungarian Navy force consisting of the scout cruiser Helgoland and the destroyers Balaton, Csepel, Lika, Orjen, Tátra, and Triglav left the Austro-Hungarian naval base at Cattaro on 18 October 1917 to attack Italian convoys. The Austro-Hungarians found no convoys, so Helgoland and Lika moved to within sight of Brindisi to entice Italian ships into chasing them and lure the Italians into an ambush by the Austro-Hungarian submarines U-32 and U-40. Giuseppe Missori got underway from Brindisi with the scout cruisers Aquila and Sparviero, the destroyers Antonio Mosto and Indomito, the British light cruisers HMS Gloucester and HMS Newcastle, and the French destroyers Bisson, Commandant Bory, and Commandant Rivière to join other Italian ships in pursuit of the Austro-Hungarians, but after a long chase which also saw some Italian air attacks on the Austro-Hungarian ships, the Austro-Hungarians escaped and all the Italian ships returned to port without damage.

On the night of 1–2 July 1918 Giuseppe Missori and the destroyers Audace, Francesco Stocco, Giovanni Acerbi, Giuseppe La Masa, Giuseppe Sirtori, and Vincenzo Giordano Orsini provided distant support to a formation consisting of the torpedo boats Climene and Procione and the coastal torpedo boats 15 OS, 18 OS, 48 OS, 3 PN, 40 PN, 64 PN, 65 PN, and 66 PN. While 15 OS, 18 OS, and 3 PN, towing dummy landing pontoons, staged a simulated amphibious landing to distract Austro-Hungarian troops in support of an Italian advance on the Italian front, 48 OS, 40 PN, 64 PN, 65 PN, and 66 PN bombarded the Austro-Hungarian lines between Cortellazzo and Caorle, proceeding at low speed between the two locations, with Climeme and Procione in direct support. Meanwhile, an Austro-Hungarian force consisting of Balaton, the destroyer Csikós, and the torpedo boats TB 83F and TB 88F had put to sea from Pola late on the evening of 1 July to support an Austro-Hungarian air raid on Venice. After an Italian MAS boat made an unsuccessful torpedo attack against Balaton, which was operating with a faulty boiler, at first light on 2 July, the Italian and Austro-Hungarian destroyers sighted one another at 03:10 on 2 July. The Italians opened gunfire on the Austro-Hungarians, who returned fire. During the brief exchange of gunfire that followed, Balaton, in a more advanced position, suffered several shell hits on her forward deck, while Giuseppe Missori, Audace, and Giuseppe La Masa fired on Csikós and the two torpedo boats, scoring a hit on Csikós in her aft boiler room and one hit on each of the torpedo boats. On the Italian side, Francesco Stocco suffered damage which set her on fire and killed and injured some of her crew. While Giovanni Acerbi remained behind to assist Francesco Stocco, the Austro-Hungarians withdrew toward Pola and the Italians resumed operations in support of their own torpedo boats.

By late October 1918, Austria-Hungary had effectively disintegrated, and the Armistice of Villa Giusti, signed on 3 November 1918, went into effect on 4 November 1918 and brought hostilities between Austria-Hungary and the Allies to an end. On 3 November, Giuseppe Missori got underway from Venice with Audace, Giuseppe La Masa, and the destroyer Nicola Fabrizi and rendezvoused with Climene and Procione, which had departed Cortellazzo. The Italian ships then proceeded to Trieste, which they reached at 16:10. There they disembarked 200 members of the Carabinieri and General Carlo Petitti di Roreto, who proclaimed Italy's annexation of the city to a cheering crowd. On 5 November 1918, Giuseppe Missori, Giuseppe La Masa, the battleship Ammiraglio di Saint Bon, and the destroyers Giuseppe Cesare Abba and Rosolino Pilo entered the port at Pola, the site of an important Austro-Hungarian Navy base, after which units embarked on the ships occupied the city over the following days. World War I ended with an armistice between the Allies and the German Empire on 11 November 1918.

=== Interwar period ===
After World War I, Giuseppe Missori′s armament was revised, giving her five 102-millimetre (4 in)/35-caliber guns, two 40-millimetre (1.6 in)/35-caliber guns, and four 450-millimetre (17.7 in) torpedo tubes, and, according to some sources, two 65-millimetre (2.6 in) machine guns. Her full-load displacement rose to 900 tonnes (886 long tons).

On the morning of 6 August 1928 Giuseppe Missori and Giuseppe Cesare Abba, serving as flagship of the 5th Destroyer Flotilla, got underway from Poreč (Parenzo) to take part with numerous other ships in an exercise in the Adriatic Sea. Plans called for the flotilla to escort the light cruiser Brindisi and scout cruiser Aquila while they cruised from Poreč to Pola and back and included a simulated attack on the formation by the submarines F14 and F15. At 08:40, under clear skies, with rough seas and rising winds, Giuseppe Cesare Abba sighted F14′s periscope only a few meters off her starboard beam, and signaled "submarine to starboard abeam" to the other ships, making no mention of the F14′s proximity to her. Her signal prompted the crew of Giuseppe Missori, a short distance astern of Giuseppe Cesare Abba, to focus attention to starboard of their ship, the apparent direction of the expected simulated attack, rather than ahead, where F14 had been sighted just abeam of Giuseppe Cesare Abba. By the time Giuseppe Missori′s crew sighted F14 ahead of their ship, the two vessels were only 160 to 180 metres (170 to 200 yd) apart. Both Giuseppe Missori and F14 took evasive action, but too late to avoid a collision, and Giuseppe Missori rammed F14. F14 sank quickly 7 nautical miles (13 km; 8.1 mi) west of the Brijuni archipelago. Efforts to rescue men trapped aboard the wreck of F14 failed, and they eventually died of asphyxiation by chlorine gas. Giuseppe Missori suffered a damaged bow in the collision and entered dry dock for repair.

Giuseppe Missori was reclassified as a torpedo boat on 1 October 1929. From 1936 to 1938, she took part in the Italian intervention on behalf of the Spanish Nationalists in the Spanish Civil War, patrolling the Strait of Sicily to prevent the smuggling of supplies to Spanish Republican forces.

=== World War II ===
==== Italian service ====
World War II broke out in September 1939 with Nazi Germany's invasion of Poland. Italy joined the war on the side of the Axis powers with its invasion of France on 10 June 1940. At the time, Giuseppe Missori was part of the 6th Torpedo Boat Squadron, along with Giovanni Acerbi, Giuseppe Sirtori, and Rosolino Pilo. During the war, she mainly served as an escort, operating on convoy routes in the Mediterranean Sea between Italy and Libya, in the southern Tyrrhenian Sea, in the waters of Sicily, and in the Adriatic Sea. On 27–28 June 1940 Giuseppe Missori and Rosolino Pilo transported supplies and 52 soldiers from Taranto, Italy, to Tripoli, Libya.

From 8 to 10 February 1941 Giuseppe Missori, the destroyer Turbine, and the torpedo boats Castore and Orsa escorted the first convoy carrying troops of the German Afrika Korps. The convoy, composed of the steamers Alicante, Ankara, and Arcturus, had to stop temporarily at Palermo, Sicily, to avoid the British Royal Navy's Force H. Giuseppe Missori began her return voyage to Italy at 08:30 on 11 February 1941, when she and the auxiliary cruiser Deffenu departed Tripoli to escort the steamers Bainsizza, Motia, Sabaudia, and Utilitas to Palermo and Naples. After two unsuccessful attacks by the British submarine HMS Truant, the first at 33°36′N 012°53′E and the second at 33°46′N 012°57′E, the convoy returned to Tripoli. It got back underway at 23:30 on 11 February arrived in Italy without further incident.

On 10 April 1941 Giuseppe Missori got underway from Palermo with the torpedo boats Generale Carlo Montanari and Perseo to escort a convoy made up of the steamers Bosforo and Ogaden and the tankers Persiano and Superga to Tripoli. A British formation composed of the destroyers HMS Jervis, HMS Janus, HMS Mohawk, and HMS Nubian sortied from Malta to intercept the convoy but did not find it, and on 11 April, the British submarine HMS Upholder unsuccessfully attacked the convoy off Cape Bon, Tunisia. On 12 April, however, the British submarine HMS Tetrarch torpedoed and sank Persiano at 33°29′N 014°01′E.

In the aftermath of the destruction of an Italian convoy by British destroyers on 16 April 1941 in the Battle of the Tarigo Convoy, Giuseppe Missori took part in operations to rescue the convoy's survivors.

On 3 June 1941 the "Aquitania" convoy, composed of the merchant ships Aquitania, Beatrice Costa, Caffaro, Montello, and Nirvo and the tanker Pozarica, departed from Naples for a voyage to Tripoli escorted by Giuseppe Missori and the destroyers Aviere, Camicia Nera, Dardo, and Geniere. On 4 June, while the ships were about 20 nautical miles (37 km; 23 mi) from the Kerkennah Islands, they came under attack by British planes which hit Montello and Beatrice Costa. Montello exploded and sank with no survivors, while Beatrice Costa suffered such serious damage that her crew abandoned ship and Camicia Nera sank her.

In 1943 Giuseppe Missori was assigned to the 3rd Torpedo Boat Group in the Ionian and Lower Adriatic Maritime Military Department along with Francesco Stocco, Giuseppe Cesare Abba, Giuseppe Sirtori, and the torpedo boats Enrico Cosenz and Giuseppe Dezza.

On 8 September 1943, the Kingdom of Italy announced an armistice with the Allies and switched sides in the war, prompting Nazi Germany to begin Operation Achse, the disarmament by force of the Italian armed forces and the occupation of those portions of Italy not yet under Allied control. At the time, Giuseppe Missori was at Durrës (known to the Italians as Durazzo) on the coast of the Italian Protectorate of Albania. She, Rosolino Pilo, and the steamer Marco bombarded German positions, but German forces captured her on 10 September 1943.

==== German service ====
Nazi Germany incorporated the ship into the Kriegsmarine with the name TA22. Her first operation in German service — with her Italian crew still aboard to operate her, supervised by German personnel — was to escort a convoy of other Italian ships captured at Durrës — Rosolino Pilo, the auxiliary cruiser Arborea, and the steamers Argentina and Italia — on a voyage to Trieste. The convoy departed Durrës on 25 September 1943. During the voyage, the Italian crew of Rosolino Pilo overwhelmed the German guards aboard their ship on 26 September, took back control of her, and steamed her to Allied-controlled Brindisi. TA22 and the rest of the convoy arrived at Trieste later on 26 September.

TA22′s Italian crew sabotaged her on 6 October 1943, but the Germans repaired her and returned her to service. On 25 June 1944, however, she suffered serious damage in an attack by British aircraft while operating southeast of Trieste. Towed to the Julian March, she was deemed beyond worthwhile repair, laid up on 11 August 1944, and stripped of useful weapons and equipment.

On 3 May 1945, TA 22 was scuttled at Muggia. Her wreck was refloated in 1949 and subsequently scrapped.
