= Italian submarine F14 =

Italian Navy submarine of 1917–1928

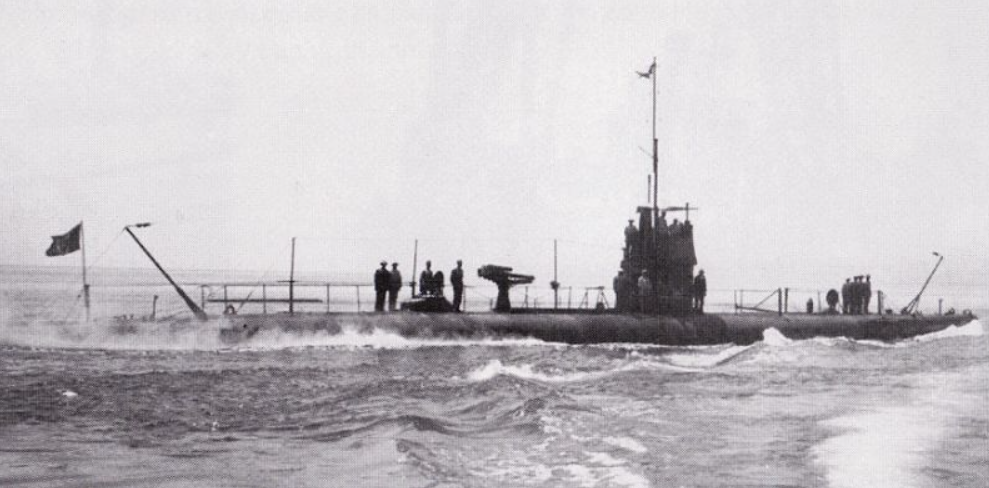

History

Italy
- Name: F14
- Builder: Odero, Sestri Ponente, Italy
- Laid down: 2 October 1915
- Launched: 23 January 1917
- Commissioned: 18 March 1917
- Identification: Pennant number F14
- Motto: Sicut felis patiens vigil audax ("Patient, alert, and bold as a feline")
- Fate: Sunk in collision 6 August 1928; Refloated 7 August 1928; scrapped

General characteristics
- Class & type: F-class submarine
- Displacement: 262 long tons (266 t) (surfaced); 319 long tons (324 t) (submerged)
- Length: 45.6 m (149 ft 7 in) (overall); 45.1 m (148 ft 0 in) (between perpendiculars)
- Beam: 4.2 m (13 ft 9 in)
- Draught: 3.1 m (10 ft 2 in)
- Propulsion: 2 × 670 bhp (500 kW) Fiat diesel engines; 2 × 500 hp (373 kW) Savigliano electric motors; 2 x shafts; 15 tons diesel fuel
- Speed: 12.5 knots (23.2 km/h; 14.4 mph) (surfaced); 8.2 knots (15.2 km/h; 9.4 mph) (submerged)
- Range: 1,600 nmi (3,000 km; 1,800 mi) at 8.5 knots (15.7 km/h; 9.8 mph) (surfaced); 80 nmi (150 km; 92 mi) at 4 knots (7.4 km/h; 4.6 mph) (submerged)
- Test depth: 45 metres (148 feet)
- Complement: 26 (2 officers, 24 men)
- Armament: 2 × 450 mm (17.7 in) torpedo tubes (2 bow); 4 x torpedoes; 1 × 76 mm (3 in) deck gun
- Notes: SOURCE:

F14 was an F-class submarine that served in the Italian Regia Marina (Royal Navy). Commissioned in 1917, she took part in World War I, conducting antisubmarine patrols in the northern Tyrrhenian Sea during the Mediterranean U-boat campaign and seeing service in the Adriatic Campaign of World War I. After the war, she sank in a collision with the loss of her entire crew in 1928.

== Construction and commissioning ==
F14 was laid down by Cantieri navali Odero (Odero Shipyards) at Sestri Ponente, Italy, on 2 October 1915. She was launched on 23 January 1917 and commissioned on 18 March 1917.

== Service history ==
=== World War I ===
After F14 entered service, the Italian Regia Marina (Royal Navy) assigned her to the La Spezia Maritime Command. Under its direction, she conducted antisubmarine patrols in the northern Tyrrhenian Sea during the Mediterranean U-boat campaign.

F14 later was transferred to the Adriatic Sea, where she participated in the Adriatic Campaign. She operated in an offensive role against Austria-Hungary's trade routes and along the coast of Dalmatia. Following a mission she conducted from 25 to 27 July 1917, she received a commendation.

At the beginning of March 1918 F14 deployed to the Faresina Channel in anticipation of a sortie by the Austro-Hungarian Navy's battle fleet, but she did not sight any ships. In July 1918 she penetrated Austro-Hungarian minefields in the Porer Reef area in the hope of ambushing Austro-Hungarian ships leaving Pola, but without success. During World War I she completed 35 combat patrols, but did not successfully attack any ships.

By late October 1918, Austria-Hungary had effectively disintegrated, and the Armistice of Villa Giusti, signed on 3 November 1918, went into effect on 4 November 1918 and brought hostilities between Austria-Hungary and the Allies to an end. Immediately afterwards, F14 arrived in Šibenik (known to the Italians as Sebenico) and engaged in demining of the waters off that port. Her crew also went ashore to perform military police duties. World War I ended with the Armistice of 11 November 1918 between the Allies and the German Empire.

=== 1918–1928 ===
Based in Venice after the war, F14 conducted training cruises in the northern Adriatic Sea. She was assigned to the Submarine Division based at Brindisi, Italy, in 1925.

=== Loss ===
==== Collision and sinking ====
On the morning of 6 August 1928, F14 got underway from Pola in company with her sister ship F15 for an exercise in the Adriatic Sea. The submarines had 14 student engineers from the Corpo Reali Equipaggi Marittimi (Corps of Royal Naval Crews) schools at Pola aboard, with seven of them embarked on each submarine. The exercise called for the submarines to make a mock attack on the light cruiser Brindisi as she steamed from Poreč (known to the Italians as Parenzo) to Pola under escort by the scout cruiser Aquila and the ships of the V Destroyer Flotilla. At 06:30, F14 reached her planned attack position and submerged.

Brindisi rendezvoused with Aquila and the destroyers west of Poreč and proceeded toward Pola. The ships took up a three-column formation with Brindisi and Aquila in a center column and the destroyers steaming in line ahead on either side of them. F15 conducted her mock attack on the ships and — following the plans for the exercise — surfaced immediately afterward and set course for Pola.

At 08:40, under clear skies, with rough seas and rising winds, the warships were steaming in waters 45 to 50 metres (148 to 164 feet) deep when the destroyer Giuseppe Cesare Abba sighted F14′s periscope only a few meters off her starboard beam, and signaled "submarine to starboard abeam" to the other ships, making no mention of F14′s proximity to her. Her signal prompted the crew of the destroyer Giuseppe Missori, steaming a short distance astern of Giuseppe Cesare Abba, to focus attention to starboard of their ship, the apparent direction of the expected simulated attack, rather than ahead, where F14 had been sighted just abeam of Giuseppe Cesare Abba. By the time Giuseppe Missori′s crew sighted F14, the submarine was in Giuseppe Cesare Abba′s wake and only 160 to 180 metres (170 to 200 yards) ahead of Giuseppe Missori. Both Giuseppe Missori and F14 took evasive action, with Giuseppe Missori going to full astern on her engines and beginning a hard turn to starboard and F14, which was in the act of surfacing, also attempting a starboard turn. However, F14 remained virtually stationary, and in any event it was too late to avoid a collision. Giuseppe Missori rammed F14 aft of her stern hatch, tearing a 60 by 25 cm (24 by 10 in) gash in F14′s pressure hull that opened her sixth compartment to the sea. The impact forced F14 to heel to starboard. Her bow rose out of the water, exposing her torpedo tubes, as she sank quickly by the stern 7 nautical miles (13 km; 8.1 mi) west of the islet of Sveti Ivan na Pučini (known to the Italians as San Giovanni in Pelago) in the Brijuni archipelago off Rovinj (known to the Italians as Rovigno).

==== Rescue and recovery effort ====
Air bubbles and an oil slick rose to the surface at the point of the sinking. The destroyer Fratelli Cairoli was sent to recall F15 to the scene and Brindisi reported the collision to Italian authorities and requested the immediate dispatch of divers and salvage pontoons. The ships stopped their engines, anchored near where F14 sank, and launched boats whose crews — with diffculty in the wind and sea conditions — dropped marker buoys at the site of the sinking. For her part, Brindisi launched her whaleboat with a diver and a trawl net aboard.

Shortly after the sinking, survivors trapped aboard F14 began using her Fessenden-type hydrophone and underwater signaling system to attempt to contact the other ships, but they did not succeed until after F15 — also equipped with a Fessenden system — arrived on the scene. At 10:35, F15 finally managed to pick up a message from F14 that read "Why don't you answer me?" The men trapped aboard F14 were able to communicate that F14 was lying on the seabed at a depth of 40 metres (131 feet), down by the stern with a list of 70 degrees, and that of 27 men aboard, four engine operators trapped in the two after compartments had drowned when those compartments flooded immediately at the moment of the collision. The other 23 men were unharmed in the other compartments, but when water entered the fourth and fifth compartments they had moved into the three forward compartments, which remained dry. Meanwhile, the commanding officer of the 240-ton crane barge GA 141, standing by with her boilers lit, received orders at 10:30 to begin preparations to get underway from Pola and recover F14.

Using divers and seines, Brindisi and Aquila searched for F14. A squadron of seaplanes from Venice arrived at 16:00 to assist in the search, but the weather conditions made the work of the small boats difficult, and the seaplanes, although they reported that they had spotted F14, could provide only vague information on her whereabouts. F14′s survivors reported hearing Aquila′s anchor chain dragging nearby, which assisted searchers in pinpointing F14′s location. At 18:00, a small diving boat from F15 positioned itself directly over F14 and moored itself to the stricken submarine just as F14 signalled "You have come very close. Hurry up. We will die here." At 19:34 she signalled "You are here...Hurry up" and at 19:45 "Deep...sea...divers above...us." Divers from the boat attached first a hemp line and then a steel cable to F14. This in turn allowed rescuers to connect an air hose to F14, and they began to pump air into F14 at 20:22 in an attempt to keep the trapped men from suffocating. Unfortunately, the effort backfired with lethal consequences, because it increased the air pressure in the submarine — which had reached four to five atmospheres by 20:00 — without correctly compensating for it with ventilation, making the air even more unbreathable because carbon dioxide becomes lethal at lower and lower concentrations as air pressure increases. At 21:17, F14, communicating in Morse code, sent a wordless message consisting only of long dashes, followed by a message at 21:40 consisting of more long dashes, with the transmission growing increasingly weak. At 21:50, F14 transmitted two final dashes. Rescuers heard no more from the men aboard F14.

Delayed by the rough seas and a lack of adequately powered tugboats, GA 141 did not leave Pola until 19:45 on 6 August and did not arrive at the site of the sinking until 01:00 on 7 August. She moored there with great difficulty. A diver tapped on F14′s hull at 06:00, but F14′s crew did not respond.

By 08:30, a diver had secured lifting pontoons to F14 and attached a cable from it to a tug, and at 10:15 on 7 August, with the tug keeping the cable taut, the attempt to bring her to the surface began. At 11:00, a diver discovered that Aquila′s anchor chain was running across F14′s deck, hampering the operation by causing F14 to list. While F14 was freed from Aquila′s anchor chain, the tug's cable was attached to the 30-ton barge GA 145, which had arrived from Pola.

The bridge and conning tower of F14 appeared at the surface at 18:00 on 7 August, but by then all hope of saving the trapped men had vanished. When rescuers opened F14′s hatches at 18:40, a cloud of poisonous chlorine gas came out of F14′s compartments. A naval surgeon volunteered to enter F14 wearing a gas mask despite the risk of asphyxiation. Almost asphyxiated himself, he recovered the body of a torpedoman and confirmed that F14′s entire crew — two officers, five petty officers , four leading seamen, and 16 sailors and cadets — had perished, four by drowning and the other 23 asphyxiated by carbon dioxide and chlorine gas. The hatches were then closed, and F14, secured by lifting pontoons, was towed to Pola and brought into dry dock there on the morning of 8 August 1928.

==== Aftermath ====
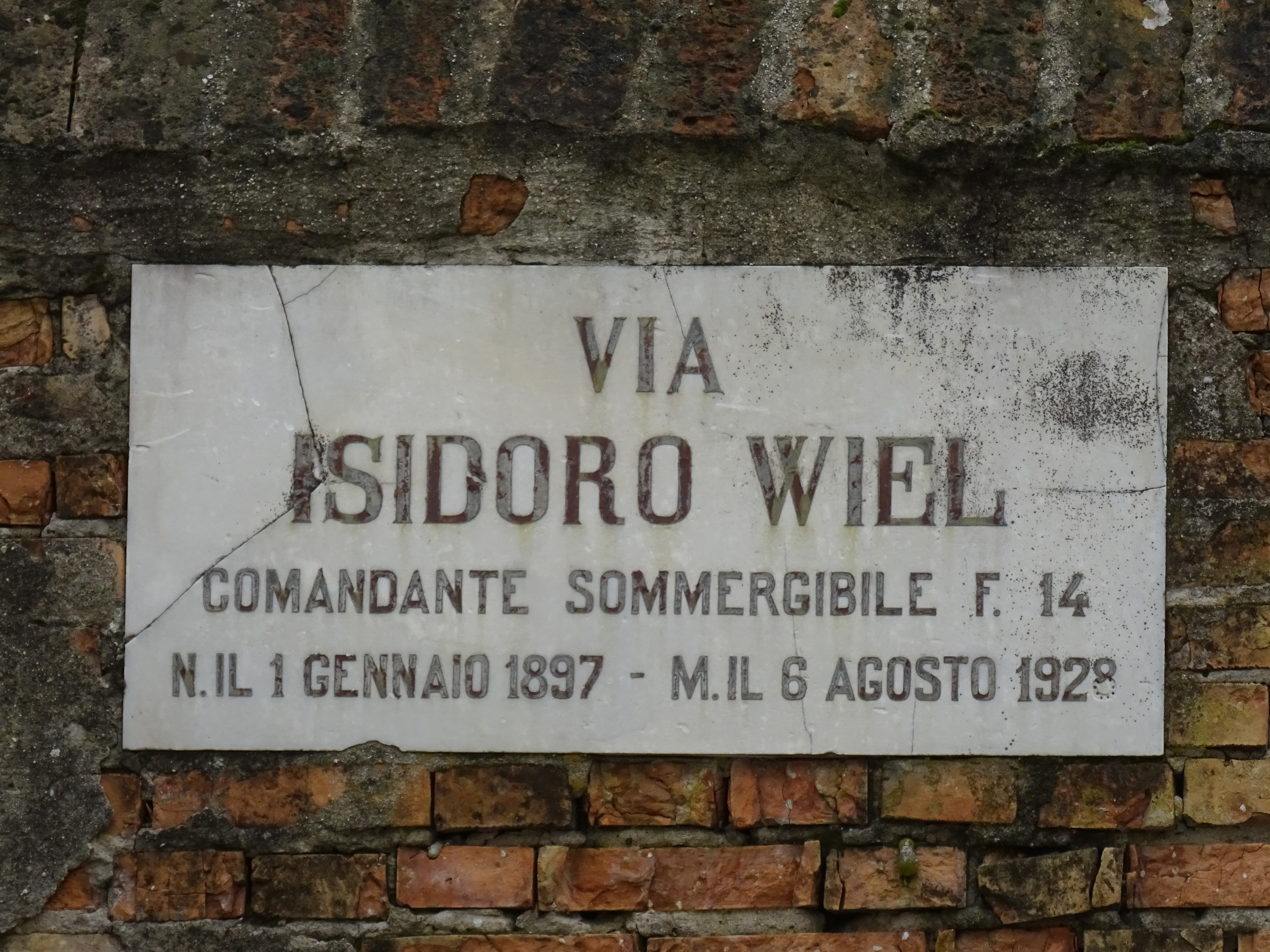
A street sign in Padua, Italy, outside the Jewish cemetery on Via Isidoro Wiel. The street is named for Capitano di corvetta (Corvette Captain) Isidoro Wiel (1 January 1897–6 August 1928), who died while in command of F14 when she sank in a collision in August 1928.

At 10:00 on 8 August 1928, the bodies of the four men who had drowned at the stern were recovered, then, starting at 10:30, the extraction of the other 23 victims took place. They were determined to have been asphyxiated within 12 hours of the sinking by the buildup of carbon dioxide and chlorine gas in the air in the submarine.

On 9 August 1928, the bodies of the 27 dead were given a solemn funeral in the presence of numerous authorities. The disaster had greatly affected Italian public opinion, and Italian newspapers covered the funeral widely.

The wreck of F14 was scrapped shortly thereafter. Her commanding officer at the time of her loss, Capitano di corvetta (Corvette Captain) Isidoro Wiel (1 January 1897–6 August 1928), received a posthumous Silver Medal of Military Valor.
