= Italian destroyer Francesco Nullo (1914) =

Italian Rosolino Pilo-class destroyer

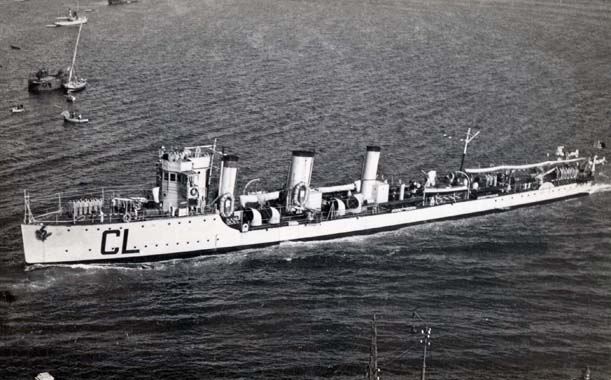
- Fratelli Cairoli (ex-Francesco Nullo)

History

Kingdom of Italy
- Name: Francesco Nullo
- Namesake: Francesco Nullo (1826–1863), Italian soldier and patriot
- Builder: Cantiere Pattison, Naples, Kingdom of Italy
- Laid down: 24 September 1913
- Launched: 12 November 1914
- Commissioned: 1 May 1915
- Identification: Pennant number NL
- Namesake: The Cairoli brothers, eight Italian patriots of the mid-19th century
- Renamed: Fratelli Cairoli 16 January 1921
- Reclassified: Torpedo boat 1 October 1929
- Identification: Pennant number CL
- Fate: Sunk 23 December 1940

General characteristics
- Class & type: Rosolino Pilo-class destroyer
- Displacement: 912 tons (max); 770 tons (standard)
- Length: 73 m (240 ft)
- Beam: 7.3 m (24 ft)
- Draught: 2.3 m (7 ft 7 in)
- Installed power: 16,000 brake horsepower (11,931 kW)
- Propulsion: 1 × Tosi steam turbines; 4 × Thornycroft boilers
- Speed: 30 knots (56 km/h; 35 mph)
- Range: 1,200 nmi (2,200 km; 1,400 mi) at 14 knots (26 km/h; 16 mph)
- Complement: 69–79
- Armament: 1915–1918: 4 × 1 Cannon 76/40 Model 1916; 2 × 1 76mm/30 AA; 4 × 1 450 mm (17.7 in) torpedo tubes; 10 mines; 1919–1921: 5 × 1 102 mm (4.0 in)/35 guns; 2 × 1 – 40 mm/39 AA; 2 × 1 65-millimetre (2.6 in) machine guns; 4 × 1 450 mm (17.7 in) torpedo tubes

Francesco Nullo was an Italian Rosolino Pilo-class destroyer. Commissioned into service in the Italian Regia Marina ("Royal Navy") in 1915, she served in World War I, participating in the Adriatic campaign. She supported Gabriele D'Annunzio′s actions in Fiume in 1920, and was renamed Fratelli Cairoli in 1921. Reclassified as a torpedo boat in 1929, she served in the Mediterranean campaign of World War II until she was sunk in 1940.

== Construction and commissioning ==
Francesco Nullo was laid down at the Cantiere Pattison (Pattison Shipyard) in Naples, Italy, on 24 September 1913. She was launched on 12 November 1914 and completed and commissioned on 1 May 1915.

== Service history ==
=== World War I ===
World War I broke out in 1914, and the Kingdom of Italy entered the war on the side of the Allies with its declaration of war on Austria-Hungary on 23 May 1915. Francesco Nullo, under the command of Capitano di corvetta (Corvette captain) Catellani, had been in commission for only a little over three weeks when Italy declared war. At the time, she was part of the 1st Destroyer squadron along with the destroyers Animoso, Ardente, Ardito, and Audace, based at Brindisi.

On the afternoon of 6 December 1915, Francesco Nullo, the protected cruiser Quarto, the scout cruiser Guglielmo Pepe, the auxiliary cruiser Città di Catania, the minelayers Minerva and Partenope, and the destroyers Borea, Giuseppe Cesare Abba, and Ippolito Nievo departed Taranto, Italy, to escort a convoy to Vlorë (known to the Italians as Valona) in the Principality of Albania. The convoy — made up of the troopships America, Cordova, Dante Alighieri, and Indiana — carried 400 officers, 6,300 non-commissioned officers and soldiers, and 1,200 draft animals. The convoy reached Vlorë at 08:00 on 7 December 1915.

On 3 May 1916 Francesco Nullo, under the command of Luigi Biancheri, a future admiral, got underway with her sister ship Giuseppe Missori and the scout cruisers Cesare Rossarol and Guglielmo Pepe to provide distant support to the destroyers Fuciliere and Zeffiro as they laid a minefield in the Adriatic Sea off Šibenik (known to the Italians as Sebenico) on the coast of Austria-Hungary. Off Punta Maestra, the Italian formation sighted four Austro-Hungarian Navy Huszár-class destroyers and six Austro-Hungarian torpedo boats and steered to attack them. While the Austro-Hungarian ships headed toward the Austro-Hungarian naval base at Pola with the Italians in pursuit, three Austro-Hungarian seaplanes attacked the Italian ships. The Italians repelled the attack, but at 15:50, after an Austro-Hungarian cruiser and two additional Austro-Hungarian torpedo boats departed Pola to support the Austro-Hungarian ships, the Italian force gave up the chase and withdrew. Meanwhile, Fuciliere and Zeffiro succeeded in laying the minefield during the night of 3–4 May 1916.

On 12 June 1916, escorted by Cesare Rossarol and Guglielmo Pepe as far as the Austro-Hungarian defensive barrage, Francesco Nullo and Giuseppe Missori supported Fuciliere, Zeffiro, the destroyer Alpino, and the coastal torpedo boats 30 PN and 46 PN as they forced the port of Poreč on the western side of Istria, a peninsula on Austria-Hungary's coast, at dawn. On 1–2 November 1916, Francesco Nullo, Giuseppe Missori, Guglielmo Pepe, and the scout cruiser Alessandro Poerio made ready to provide possible support to an incursion by MAS motor torpedo boats into the Fažana Channel on the southwest coast of Istria.

By late October 1918, Austria-Hungary had effectively disintegrated, and the Armistice of Villa Giusti, signed on 3 November 1918, went into effect on 4 November 1918 and brought hostilities between Austria-Hungary and the Allies to an end. World War I ended a week later with the armistice between the Allies and the German Empire on 11 November 1918.

=== Interwar period ===
==== 1919–1921 ====
After the end of World War I, Francesco Nullo′s armament was revised, giving her five 102-millimetre (4 in)/35-caliber guns, two 40-millimetre (1.6 in)/35-caliber guns, and four 450-millimetre (17.7 in) torpedo tubes, and, according to some sources, two 65-millimetre (2.6 in) machine guns. Her full-load displacement rose to 900 tonnes (886 long tons).

Before Italy entered World War I, it had made a pact with the Allies, the Treaty of London of 1915, in which it was promised all of the Austrian Littoral, but not the city of Fiume (known in Croatian as Rijeka). After the war, at the Paris Peace Conference in 1919, this delineation of territory was confirmed, with Fiume remaining outside of Italy's borders and amalgamated into the Kingdom of the Serbs, Croats and Slovenes (which in 1929 would be renamed the Kingdom of Yugoslavia). Opposing this outcome, the poet and Italian nationalist Gabriele D'Annunzio led a force of about 2,600 so-called "legionaries" to Fiume and seized the city in September 1919 in what became known as the Impresa di Fiume ("Fiume endeavor" or "Fiume enterprise"). The Italian government opposed D'Annunzio's move, but on 8 December 1919 Francesco Nullo went to Fiume and placed herself under D'Annunzio's orders.

D'Annunzio declared Fiume to be the Italian Regency of Carnaro in September 1920. Relations between Italy and D'Annunzio's government continued to deteriorate, and after Italy signed the Treaty of Rapallo with the Kingdom of the Serbs, Croats, and Slovenes in November 1920, making Fiume an independent state as the Free State of Fiume rather than incorporating it into Italy, D'Annunzio declared war on Italy. Italy launched a full-scale invasion of Fiume on 24 December 1920, beginning what became known as the Bloody Christmas. The Bloody Christmas fighting ended on 29 December 1920 in D'Annunzio's defeat and the establishment of the Free State of Fiume. With the Fiume affair at an end, Francesco Nullo surrendered to Italian forces and returned to Regia Marina control. In January 1921 she moved to Pola and on 16 January 1921 she was renamed Fratelli Cairoli.

==== 1922–1939 ====
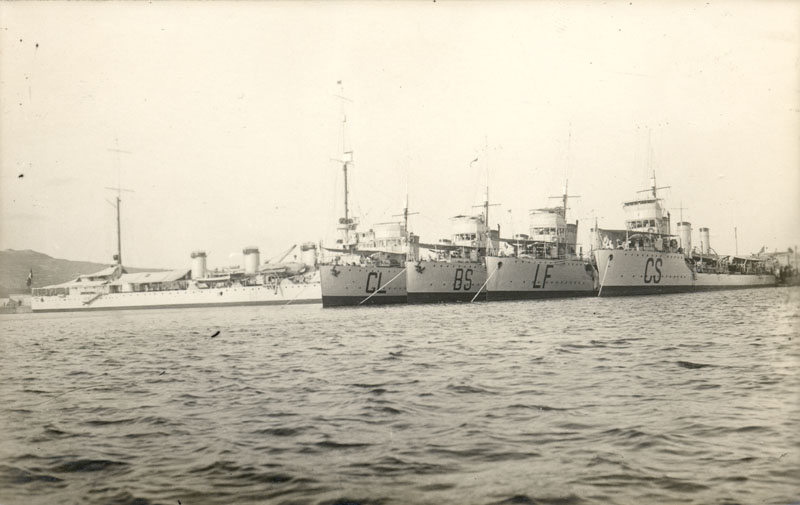
Italian torpedo boats on a visit to Varna, Bulgaria, 10–15 July 1932. Left to right, Fratelli Cairoli, Angelo Bassini, Giuseppe La Farina, and Enrico Cosenz.

During 1922, Fratelli Cairoli operated along the coast of Dalmatia between Split (known to the Italians as Spalato) and Zadar (known to the Italians as Zara). On 19 February 1926, she suffered serious damage in a collision with the destroyer Agostino Bertani. On 6 August 1928, after the sinking of the submarine F14 in a collision in the waters off Pola, Fratelli Cairoli summoned the submarine F15 to the scene and took part in operations to rescue men trapped in the wreck, all of whom were asphyxiated by chlorine gas before they could be saved. On 1 October 1929 Fratelli Cairoli was reclassified as a torpedo boat.

In 1930 and 1932 Fratelli Cairoli participated in cruises in the Levant. From 1936 to 1938, she took part in the Italian intervention on behalf of the Spanish Nationalists in the Spanish Civil War, patrolling to prevent the smuggling of supplies to Spanish Republican forces.

=== World War II ===
World War II broke out in September 1939 with Nazi Germany's invasion of Poland. Italy joined the war on the side of the Axis powers with its invasion of France on 10 June 1940. At the time, Fratelli Cairoli was part of the 9th Torpedo Boat Squadron along with the torpedo boats Antonio Mosto, Canopo, and Cassiopea, based at La Maddalena on the northern tip of Sardinia. During the war, she operated as an escort along the coast of Libya, such as from 12 to 14 September 1940, when she escorted the steamers Gloriastella and Maria Eugenia from Tripoli to Benghazi.

On 23 December 1940, while steaming from Benghazi toward Tripoli, Fratelli Cairoli struck a mine laid on 9 November by the British Royal Navy submarine HMS Rorqual off Misrata, Libya, and sank within a few minutes. Of her 71-man crew, 43 survived.
