= Italian submarine F15 =

Italian Navy submarine of 1917–1929

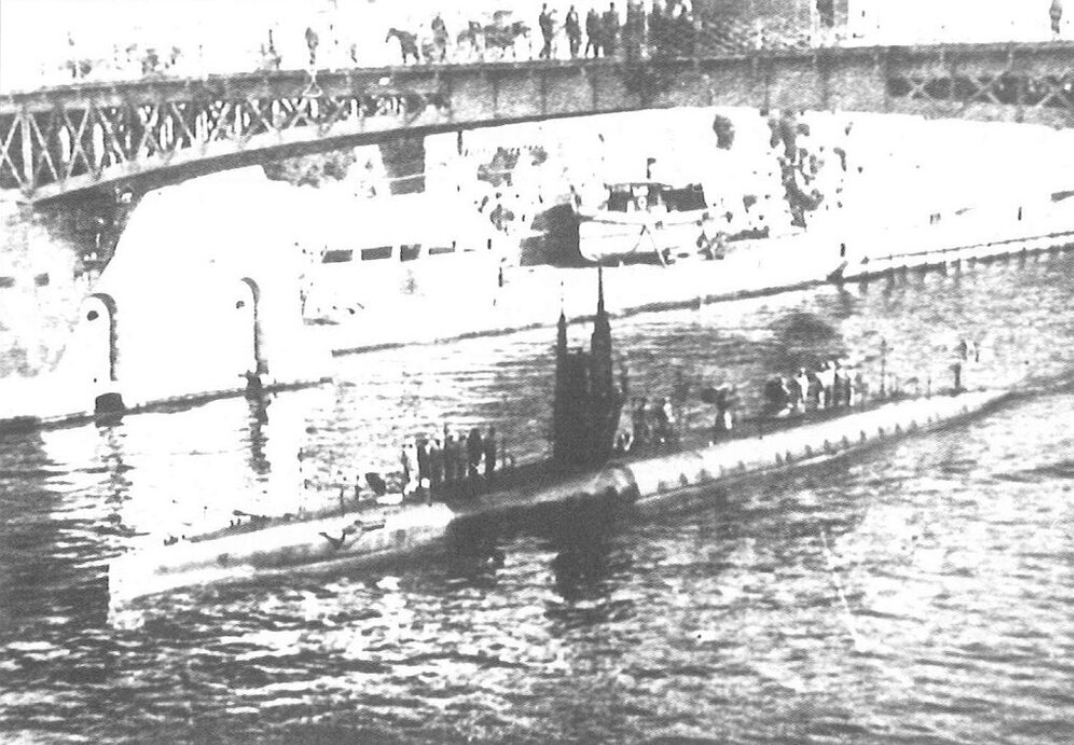
- F15 passing under the Ponte Girevole swing bridge in Taranto, Italy.

History

Italy
- Name: F15
- Builder: Orlando, Livorno, Italy
- Laid down: 7 October 1915
- Launched: 27 May 1917
- Commissioned: 13 August 1917
- Decommissioned: 28 May 1929
- Stricken: 28 May 1929
- Identification: Pennant number F15
- Motto: Vigile Attendo ("Ever Vigilant")
- Fate: Scrapped

General characteristics
- Class & type: F-class submarine
- Displacement: 262 long tons (266 t) (surfaced); 319 long tons (324 t) (submerged)
- Length: 45.6 m (149 ft 7 in) (overall); 45.1 m (148 ft 0 in) (between perpendiculars)
- Beam: 4.2 m (13 ft 9 in)
- Draught: 3.1 m (10 ft 2 in)
- Propulsion: 2 × 670 bhp (500 kW) Fiat diesel engines; 2 × 500 hp (373 kW) Savigliano electric motors; 2 x shafts; 15 tons diesel fuel
- Speed: 12.5 knots (23.2 km/h; 14.4 mph) (surfaced); 8.2 knots (15.2 km/h; 9.4 mph) (submerged)
- Range: 1,600 nmi (3,000 km; 1,800 mi) at 8.5 knots (15.7 km/h; 9.8 mph) (surfaced); 80 nmi (150 km; 92 mi) at 4 knots (7.4 km/h; 4.6 mph) (submerged)
- Test depth: 45 metres (148 feet)
- Complement: 26 (2 officers, 24 men)
- Armament: 2 × 450 mm (17.7 in) torpedo tubes (2 bow); 4 x torpedoes; 1 × 76 mm (3 in) deck gun
- Notes: SOURCE:

F15 was an F-class submarine in commission in the Italian Regia Marina (Royal Navy) from 1917 to 1929. She took part in World War I, seeing service in the Adriatic Campaign. In 1928, she participated in rescue and recovery operations for the sunken submarine F14.

== Construction and commissioning ==
F14 was laid down by Cantiere navale fratelli Orlando (Orlando Brothers Shipyard) in Livorno (Leghorn), Italy, on 7 October 1915. She was launched on 27 May 1917 and commissioned on 13 August 1917.

== Service history ==
F15 began operations on 21 September 1917 and was assigned to the Brindisi Submarine Squadron to take part in the Adriatic Campaign of World War I. She was transferred to Vlorë (known to the Italians as Valona) in Albania in December 1917 and assigned to the Valona Maritime Command for mobile defense of the base at Vlorë. In May 1918, she was assigned to the Ancona Submarine Flotilla, based operational at Porto Corsini. Before the war ended in November 1918, she conducted 15 war patrols in enemy waters.

After World War I, F15 operated mainly in the northern Adriatic Sea. During the Corfu incident, she took part in operations related to the occupation of Corfu in October 1923.

F15 spent the remainder of her career engaging in naval maneuvers and exercises. On the morning of 6 August 1928, she got underway from Pola in company with her sister ship F14 for an exercise in the Adriatic Sea. The submarines had 14 student engineers from the Corpo Reali Equipaggi Marittimi (Corps of Royal Naval Crews) schools at Pola aboard, with seven of them embarked on each submarine. The exercise called for the submarines to make a mock attack on the light cruiser Brindisi as she steamed from Poreč (known to the Italians as Parenzo) to Pola under escort by the scout cruiser Aquila and the ships of the 5th Destroyer Flotilla.

Brindisi rendezvoused with Aquila and the destroyers west of Poreč and proceeded toward Pola. The ships took up a three-column formation with Brindisi and Aquila in a center column and the destroyers steaming in line ahead on either side of them. F15 conducted her mock attack on the ships and — following the plans for the exercise — surfaced immediately afterward and set course for Pola. As she proceeded toward Pola, the destroyer Fratelli Cairoli intercepted her with the news that F14 had sunk in a collision with the destroyer Giuseppe Missori at 08:40 that morning. Fratelli Cairolli also passed orders for F15 to proceed to the scene of the disaster and provide assistance in rescue and recovery efforts.

Shortly after the sinking, survivors trapped aboard F14 began using her Fessenden-type hydrophone and underwater signaling system to attempt to contact other ships, but they did not succeed until after F15 — also equipped with a Fessenden system — arrived on the scene. At 10:35, F15 finally managed to pick up a message from F14 that read "Why don't you answer me?" The men trapped aboard F14 were able to communicate that F14 was lying on the seabed at a depth of 40 metres (131 feet), down by the stern with a list of 70 degrees, and that of 27 men aboard, four engine operators trapped in the two after compartments had drowned when those compartments flooded immediately at the moment of the collision. The other 23 men were unharmed in the other compartments, but when water entered the fourth and fifth compartments they had moved into the three forward compartments, which remained dry.

Boats and divers from Brindisi and Aquila and a squadron of seaplanes that arrived in the area at 16:00 searched for F14 to ascertain her exact position. When the men trapped aboard F14 reported that they could hear Aquila′s anchor chain dragging nearby, searchers were able to pinpoint the stricken submarine's position. At 18:00, a small diving boat from F15 positioned itself directly over F14 and moored itself to the stricken submarine just as F14 signalled "You have come very close. Hurry up. We will die here." At 19:34 she signalled "You are here...Hurry up" and at 19:45 "Deep...sea...divers above...us." Divers from F15′s boat attached first a hemp line and then a steel cable to F14. This in turn allowed rescuers to connect an air hose to F14, and they began to pump air into F14 at 20:22 in an attempt to keep the trapped men from suffocating. Unfortunately, the effort backfired with lethal consequences, because it increased the air pressure in the submarine — which had reached four to five atmospheres by 20:00 — without correctly compensating for it with ventilation, making the air even more unbreathable because carbon dioxide becomes lethal at lower and lower concentrations as air pressure increases. At 21:17, F14, communicating in Morse code, sent a wordless message consisting only of long dashes, followed by a message at 21:40 consisting of more long dashes, with the transmission growing increasingly weak. At 21:50, F14 transmitted two final dashes. Rescuers heard no more from the men aboard F14. By the time F14 was refloated on 7 August, all 27 men aboard her had perished, four by drowning during the collision itself and the rest by asphyxiation due to a buildup of carbon dioxide and chlorine gas in the submarine.

F15 was decommissioned on 28 May 1929 and stricken from the navy list the same day. She subsequently was scrapped.
