= Giuseppe Cesare Abba =

Italian writer and soldier (1838–1910)

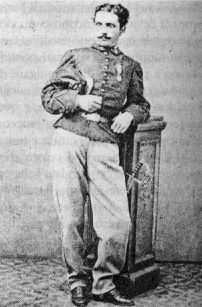
Giuseppe Cesare Abba

Giuseppe Cesare Abba (6 October 1838 – 6 November 1910) was an Italian writer and soldier. As a participant on the expedition of i Mille he fought next to Giuseppe Garibaldi in his conquest of the Kingdom of the Two Sicilies in 1860.

== Biography ==
He was born in Cairo Montenotte (Liguria, then part of the Kingdom of Sardinia/Piedmont).

Abba studied in the Academy of Fine Arts in Genoa, which he left in 1859 when entered a cavalry regiment in Pinerolo. In 1860, he moved to Parma, and then joined Garibaldi's volunteers. He took part in most of the battles which led to the dissolution of the Kingdom of the Two Sicilies.

His literary work is limited to revolutionary memories; after retiring to private life, first at Pisa, then in his native town, he attempted to write a romantic poem in five canti by the title Arrigo. A fervent follower of Manzoni, he then tried to write a historical novel (1875) with Le rive della Bormida nel 1794 ("The Banks of the Bormida in 1794"), with the notes taken in the 1860 expedition, which he did not publish. In 1880 it became Noterelle di uno dei Mille edite dopo vent’anni ("Notes by one of the Thousand twenty years later"), assuming its final title, Da Quarto al Volturno: Noterelle d’uno dei Mille ("From Quarto to Volturno: Notes by one of the Thousand"), only in 1891.

This work was his magnum opus, being released thanks to Giosuè Carducci, to whom Abba had sent it on the urging of an old revolutionary friend, Sclavo. Carducci was at that time considering writing a work on the life of Garibaldi, and encouraged the survivors of the campaign to give him historical testimonies. When he had read the Noterelle, he appreciated it so much that gave it to the editor Zanichelli to be published, telling the author that now he might never write the biography of the hero.

Abba quickly acquired fame, so much so that he became first teacher at the secondary school at Faenza, then principal of the technological institute of Brescia, where he worked until his death.

Even though he produced other works based on the expedition, none became as celebrated as the Noterelle. He also wrote poetry and short stories, but without much success.

== Works ==
- Le rive della Bormida nel 1794 (1875)
- Noterelle di uno dei Mille edite dopo vent’anni (1880)
  - A Diary of One of Garibaldi's Thousand translated by E. R. P. Vincent. London: Oxford University Press, 1962
- Da Quarto al Volturno. Noterelle d’uno dei Mille (1880–1891)
- Storia dei Mille ("Story of the Thousand", 1904)
- Vita di Nino Bixio ("The Life of Nino Bixio", 1905)
- Garibaldi. Nel primo cinquantenario della morte. Editore Milano, Vallardi
- Cose garibaldine ("Garibaldian Things")
- Romagna
- Cose vedute ("Things I Have Seen")

== Commemoration ==
The Italian destroyer Giuseppe Cesare Abba was named for him.
