= Italian submarine F11 =

Italian Navy submarine of 1916–1919

- F11 mooring at a port on the Adriatic Sea.

History

Italy
- Name: F11
- Builder: FIAT-San Giorgio, La Spezia, Italy
- Laid down: 11 July 1915
- Launched: 17 September 1916
- Commissioned: 29 December 1916
- Decommissioned: 1 September 1919
- Identification: Pennant number F11
- Fate: Scrapped

General characteristics
- Class & type: F-class submarine
- Displacement: 262 long tons (266 t) (surfaced); 319 long tons (324 t) (submerged)
- Length: 45.6 m (149 ft 7 in) (overall); 45.1 m (148 ft 0 in) (between perpendiculars)
- Beam: 4.2 m (13 ft 9 in)
- Draught: 3.1 m (10 ft 2 in)
- Propulsion: 2 × 670 bhp (500 kW) Fiat diesel engines; 2 × 500 hp (373 kW) Savigliano electric motors; 2 x shafts; 15 tons diesel fuel
- Speed: 12.5 knots (23.2 km/h; 14.4 mph) (surfaced); 8.2 knots (15.2 km/h; 9.4 mph) (submerged)
- Range: 1,600 nmi (3,000 km; 1,800 mi) at 8.5 knots (15.7 km/h; 9.8 mph) (surfaced); 80 nmi (150 km; 92 mi) at 4 knots (7.4 km/h; 4.6 mph) (submerged)
- Test depth: 45 metres (148 feet)
- Complement: 26 (2 officers, 24 men)
- Armament: 2 × 450 mm (17.7 in) torpedo tubes (2 bow); 4 x torpedoes; 1 × 76 mm (3 in) deck gun
- Notes: SOURCE:

F11 was an F-class submarine in commission in the Italian Regia Marina (Royal Navy) from 1916 to 1919. She took part in World War I, seeing service in the Adriatic Campaign.

== Construction and commissioning ==
F11 was laid down by FIAT-San Giorgio at La Spezia, Italy, on 11 July 1915. She was launched on 17 September 1916 and commissioned on 29 December 1916.

== Service history ==
F11 began operational service in May 1917 with her assignment to the Ancona Maritime Command. Taking part in the Adriatic Campaign of World War I, she conducted 16 offensive war patrols in Austro-Hungarian waters. Her most noteworthy action occurred on 16 November 1917, when she and her sister ship F13 intercepted an Austro-Hungarian Navy formation composed of the coastal defense ships Budapest and Wien, escorted by torpedo boats, minesweepers, and seaplanes, which was bombarding Italian coastal defenses at Cortellazzo on the Piave River. The two submarines and two MAS boats intervened in an attempt to force the Austro-Hungarian ships to withdraw.

World War I ended in November 1918. F11 was decommissioned on 1 September 1919 due to the poor state of her engines. She subsequently was scrapped.
