= Corpo Reali Equipaggi Marittimi =

The Corpo Reali Equipaggi Marittimi ("Corps of Royal Naval Crews"), also known as Corpo Regi Equipaggi Marittimi or Corpo Reali Equipaggi di Marina (CREM), was the corps that comprised petty officers and seamen of the Regia Marina. It operated the Royal Italian Navy's schools for specialists, such as gunners, mechanics, electricians, radio operators, sonar operators, carpenters, firemen, paymasters, nurses, motormen, helmsmen, deep-sea divers, signalmen, and rangefinder operators. Its schools were located in Venice, La Spezia and Pola.

Petty officers who were promoted to commissioned officers without attending the Naval Academy of Livorno or a reserve officers' course became CREM officers, distinct from other officers' corps of the Royal Italian Navy.

After the establishment of the Italian Republic in 1946, the corps was renamed Corpo degli Equipaggi Militari Marittimi ("Corps of Naval Crews"), CEMM.
