= Adriatic Campaign of World War I =

1914–1918 naval campaign

Battle of the Adriatic
- Part of World War I, Battle of the Mediterranean
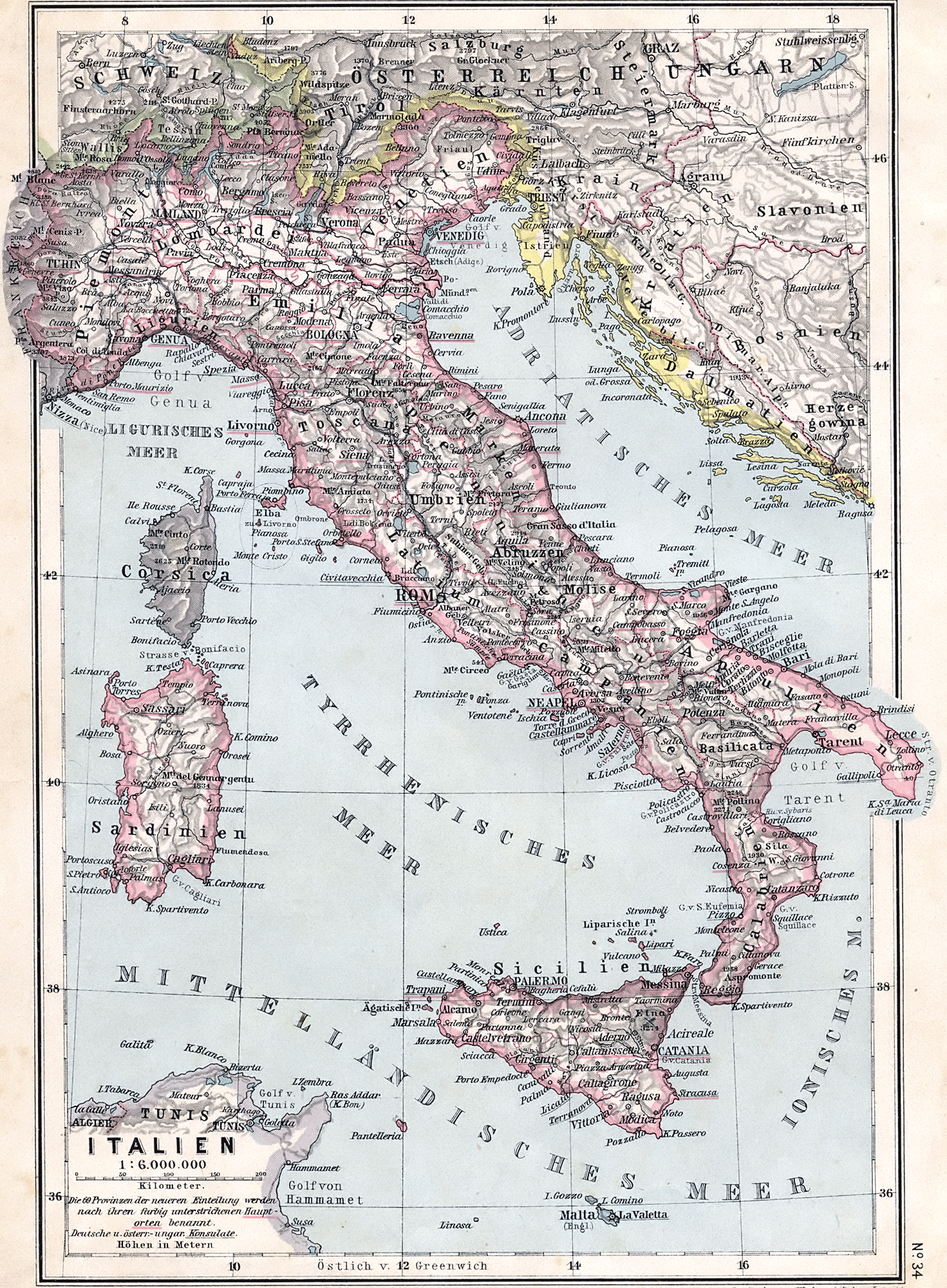
- The Adriatic Sea (upper right) during World War I, in an Austro-Hungarian map.
Date	1914–1918
Location	Adriatic Sea
Result	Allied victory

Belligerents
Allies: Regia Marina; Royal Navy; French Navy; Royal Australian Navy; United States Navy	Central Powers: Austro-Hungarian Navy; Imperial German Navy

The Adriatic Campaign of World War I was a naval campaign fought between the Central Powers and the Mediterranean squadrons of the Allies, specifically the United Kingdom, France, the Kingdom of Italy, Australia, and the United States.

== Characteristics ==
First World War naval action in the Adriatic Sea consisted mainly of Austro-Hungarian bombardments of Italy's eastern coast, and wider-ranging German and Austro-Hungarian submarine forays into the Mediterranean.

Allied forces mainly limited themselves to blockading the Central Powers' navies in the Adriatic, which was successful in regards to surface units, but failed for the U-boats, which found safe harbours and easy passage into and out of the area for the whole of the war.

Considered a relatively secondary part of the naval warfare of World War I, it nonetheless tied down significant forces.

The Adriatic campaign was also important because for the first time two new weapons were used successfully in warfare, viz. the MAS torpedo boat of Luigi Rizzo that sank the battleship Szent István and the human torpedo of Raffaele Rossetti that sank the battleship SMS Viribus Unitis in 1918.

== History ==
=== 1914 ===
==== Beginning of the war ====
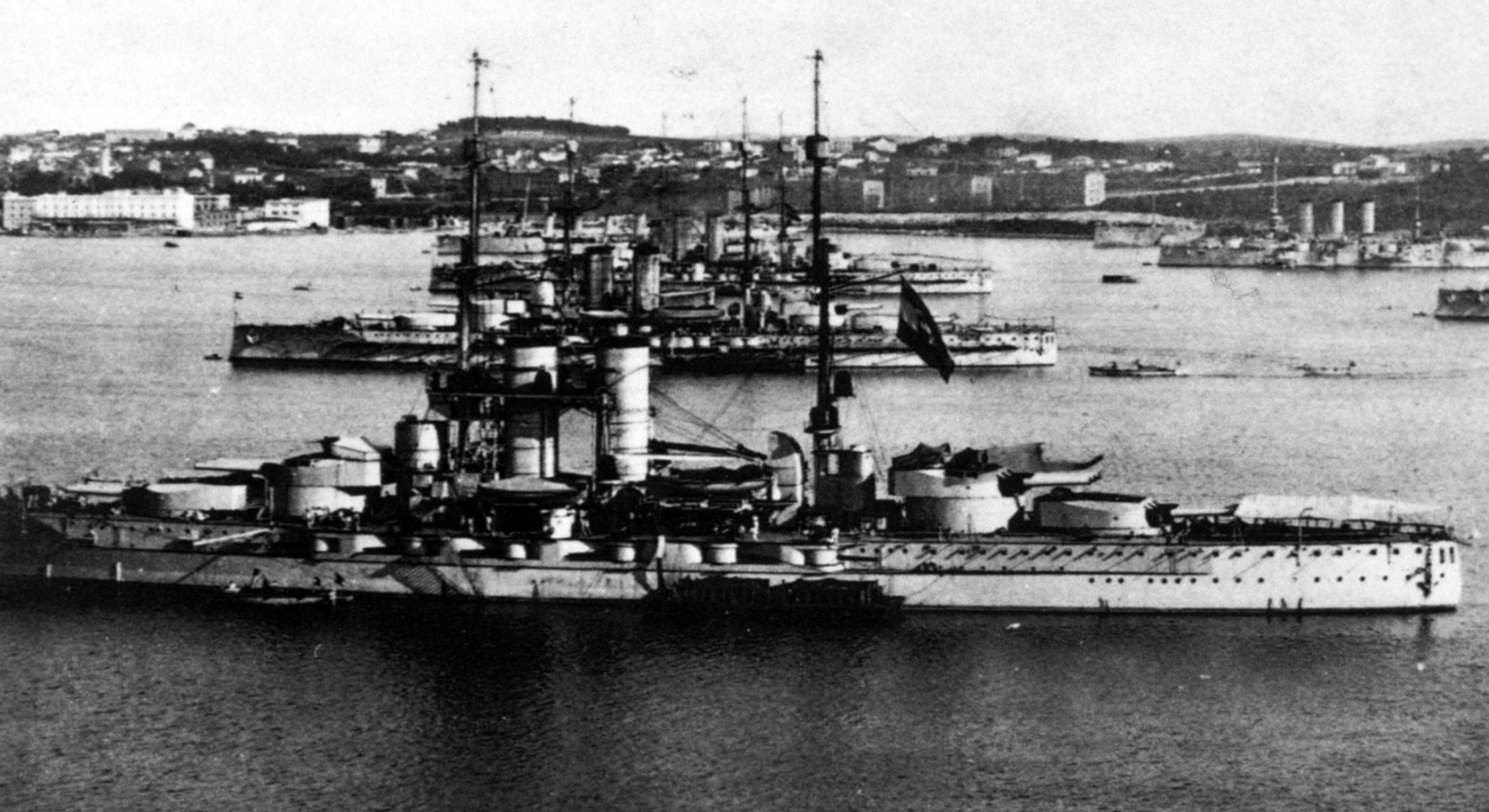
Austro-Hungarian dreadnoughts at Pola.

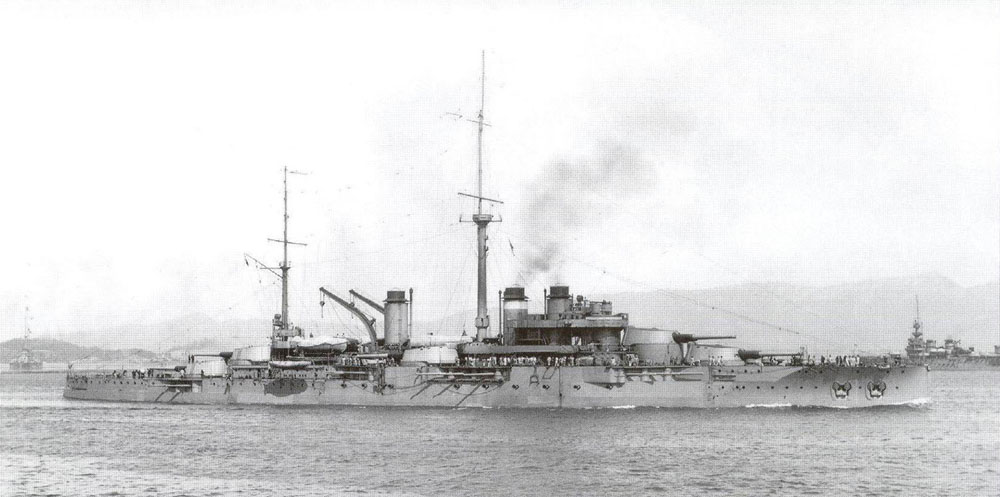
The French battleship Jean Bart.

On 6 August 1914 an Anglo-French naval agreement was signed, giving France leadership of naval operations in the Mediterranean. The remaining British Mediterranean forces – one armoured cruiser, four light cruisers, and 16 destroyers – were placed under the control of the French Mediterranean Fleet, and bases at both Gibraltar and Malta were opened to the French.

One day after the French declaration of war against Austria-Hungary on 11 August, a French fleet under Admiral Augustin Boué de Lapeyrère arrived at Malta. He had orders to sail with all available French and British ships, pass into the Adriatic Sea, and undertake whatever operations he thought best against Austrian ports. Lapeyrère decided to surprise Austrian vessels enforcing a blockade of Montenegro. The main Allied force comprised the French battleships Courbet and Jean Bart, and the cruiser Jurien de la Gravière. Two French squadrons of pre-dreadnought battleships, two squadrons of cruisers, and five destroyer squadrons were held back in support. The British support group comprised two armoured cruisers and three destroyer divisions. The Anglo-French force succeeded in cutting off and sinking the old Austro-Hungarian light cruiser SMS Zenta off Bar on 16 August in the Battle of Antivari. However, Allied hopes of baiting the Austrian capital ships into an action were not realized.

Throughout most of late August most of the action was simple bombardment of Serbian and Montenegrin troops by Austrian ships. On 9 August, the pre-dreadnought SMS Monarch shelled the French radio station at Budva, while the destroyer SMS Panther shelled Mount Lovćen. On 17 August, Monarch shelled a Montenegrin radio station off Bar, then another station off Volovica Point on 19 August. Meanwhile, a French squadron shelled Austrian troops on Prevlaka.

The French and Montenegrin forces attempted to cause havoc also at Cattaro in September, October and November 1914, and the Austro-Hungarian navy was called in there also, resulting in a decisive defeat for the Allies.

Both the French and the Austrians spent much of this time laying extensive minefields throughout the shallow waters of the Adriatic. Mostly this was done by destroyers, and at night. Several steamships ran afoul of these mines and either sank or were damaged.

==== The Goeben ====
In July, SMS Goeben, a German battlecruiser, sailed to Triest from Pola. She and the German cruiser SMS Breslau had been anchored there since the beginning of the summer. On 1 August, Goeben and Breslau rendezvoused at Brindisi, then headed for Messina to take on coal. They left for Constantinople on 6 August, shadowed by the British cruiser HMS Gloucester.

On 7 August, an Austro-Hungarian Fleet—consisting of six battleships, two cruisers, and 19 destroyers and torpedo boats—sortied from Pola to escort Goeben and Breslau through Austro-Hungarian territorial waters, returned to port following day without ever making contact. Goeben and Breslau briefly engaged HMS Gloucester and the chase was abandoned by the British. By 10 August, both German warships were safely in the Dardanelles and heading for Turkey.

==== Winter ====
In November, the French submarine Cugnot managed to slip into the Bocche di Cattaro as far as Topla Bay but was chased out by the Austrian destroyer SMS Blitz, and the torpedo boat Tb 57T. In mid-December, the French submarine Curie raided the harbour barrage of Pola to wait for her chance to intrude. Two days later, on 20 December, during an attempt to sneak into the harbour she got entangled in an anti-submarine net and could not free herself. Forced to surface for fresh air, she was sunk by the Austrian destroyer SMS Magnet and Tb 63T, with three casualties. The Austrians raised the wreck between December 1914 and February 1915. It was then repaired and commissioned as U-14 in June 1915.

On 21 December, the submarine U-12 scored one torpedo hit on the French battleship Jean Bart off Sazan Island. The battleship had to withdraw to Malta for extensive repairs.

=== 1915 ===
In February, the French destroyer Dague—while escorting the transport Whitehead to Bar—was sunk after hitting a mine. Also that month, the Austrian submarine U-12 was unsuccessfully attacked off Cape Mendra by a French submarine. Austrian destroyer SMS Csikós shelled Montenegrin positions at Bar with Tb 15 and Tb 68F.

In April, the Austrian U-5—commanded by Lt. Georg Ritter von Trapp—chased the French armoured cruiser Victor Hugo off Paxos, but was unable to fire any torpedoes. U-5 also torpedoed the French armoured cruiser Léon Gambetta after a two-day chase off Santa Maria di Leuca, causing 684 fatalities including Rear-Admiral Sénès. Only 137 French sailors survived. The Austrian U-4 torpedoed and damaged the British light cruiser HMS Dublin. Also, the Austrian destroyer SMS Warasdiner shelled enemy positions at Bar.

==== Bombardment of Ancona ====
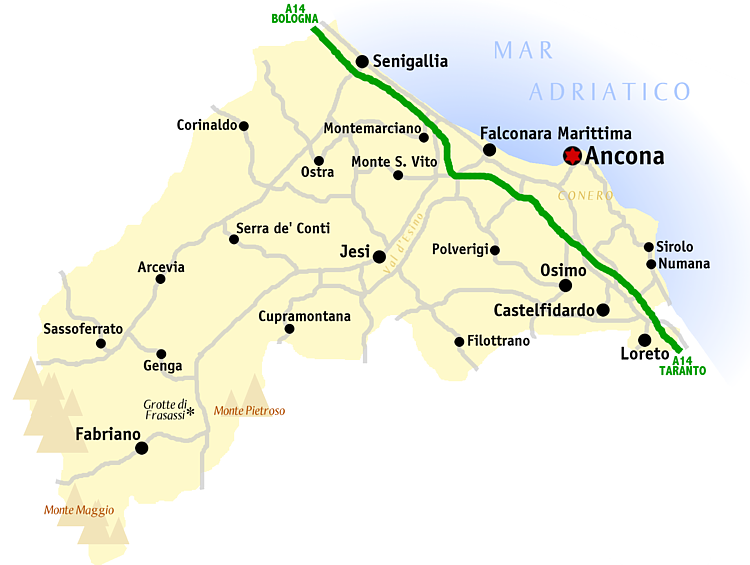
Italian province of Ancona.

When Italy declared war on Austria-Hungary on 23 May, the Austrian fleet was quick to act, launching several attacks on the Marche region of Italy. That day, the destroyer Dinara and Tb 53T bombarded the port of Ancona. The destroyer SMS Lika—on reconnaissance duty between Palagruža and Cape Gargano—shelled the semaphore and radio station at Vieste and fired upon the Italian destroyer Turbine. On 24 May, the bulk of the Austrian fleet at Pola sailed for the Italian Adriatic coast. This included the dreadnoughts Viribus Unitis, Tegetthoff, Prinz Eugen and eight semi and pre-dreadnoughts. The fleet bombarded several cities and other targets in and around the Province of Ancona, especially damaging the port and town of Ancona itself.

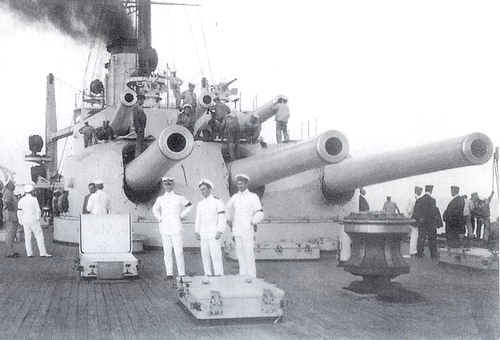
Gun turret on SMS Tegetthoff.

The destroyer SMS Velebit shelled the Italian airship Città di Ferrara off Ancona. The semi-dreadnought SMS Radetzky and two torpedo boats bombarded Potenza Picena, then returned to Pola. The Radetzky-class semi-dreadnought SMS Zrínyi, with two torpedo boats bombarded Senigallia, destroying a train and damaging a railway station and a bridge, then returned to Pola. The torpedo boat Tb 3 was unsuccessfully bombed by an Italian airship. The light cruiser SMS Admiral Spaun shelled the Italian signal station at Cretaccio Island, while the armoured cruiser SMS Sankt Georg—with two torpedo boats—shelled Rimini, damaging and derailing a freight train. The destroyer SMS Streiter shelled the signal station near Torre di Mileto. The light cruiser SMS Novara, a destroyer and two torpedo boats entered Corsini Channel and shelled an Italian torpedo boat station, a semaphore station, and coastal artillery batteries.

The light cruiser SMS Helgoland—aided by four destroyers—sank the Italian destroyer Turbine in a pitched battle south of Pelagosa. The destroyer SMS Tátra shelled the railway embankment near Manfredonia while the destroyer SMS Csepel shelled the Manfredonia railway station.

Finally, Austro-Hungarian flying boats dropped bombs on Venice and airship hangars at Chiaravalle.

==== Allied raids ====
Coincidentally with the Austro-Hungarian attack on Ancona, the Italian destroyer Zeffiro shelled and captured the Austro-Hungarian naval station and post at Porto Buso on the first hours of 24 May. Austro-Hungarian troops withdrew from the nearby town of Grado as a consequence.

On 5 June, four different Allied task forces attacked the Austrian coast. Four Italian armoured cruisers, escorted by four French destroyers, shelled Cavtat; the British cruiser Dublin—escorted by five Italian destroyers—shelled Donzella; the Italian light cruiser Quarto—escorted by four destroyers—bombarded Lastovo; the Italian light cruiser Nino Bixio, two Italian and two French destroyers shelled the island of Lissa. On 9 June, a mixed force of British, French and Italian destroyers shelled the Austro-Hungarian signal station at Cape Rondini in Albania.

==== The summer of 1915 ====
Sankt Georg and a squadron of torpedo boats bombarded Rimini on 16 June, causing minor damage. Then on 17 June, the cruisers Novara and Admiral Spaun and their escorts attacked and sank the Italian steamer Maria Grazia off Giulianova. The next day, they shelled Rimini and Fano, destroying the Italian signal station there.

The summer of 1915 was a successful time for Austrian submarines as well: on 10 June, U-11 sank the Italian submarine Medusa and torpedo boat Serpente; U-10 sank the Italian torpedo boat PN 5 on June 26 off Venice; U-4 torpedoed and sank the Giuseppe Garibaldi on 18 July; and U-5 captured the Greek steamer Cefalonia off Durazzo on August 29. But this was not without losses. On 13 August, U-3 was sunk at Brindisi by the French destroyer Bisson, after having been severely damaged by the Italian auxiliary cruiser Città di Catania the day before.

The Austro-Hungarian naval air-arm also began regular bombing raids against Bari and Brindisi in June, slightly damaging the British protected cruiser HMS Amethyst in one such raid with machine gun fire. And the British armed trawler Schiehallion was sunk by a mine. The Amalfi was sunk off Venice by the German submarine UB-14 on July 2. While the Italian scout cruiser Marsala shelled Gravosa station on 18 July, the scout cruiser Quarto and three Italian destroyers attacked the Austrian installation at Guiparra.

SMS Helgoland, seven destroyers and four torpedo boats supported an Austrian landing at Pelagosa on 28 July. The landing was repulsed by the Italian garrison, that had arrived in the island on July 11. On August 17 the light cruisers "Helgoland", "Saida" and several destroyers bombarded the island again. The water reservoir was severely damaged and the next day the Italians began the evacuation. On 17 August, one of the cruisers was unsuccessfully torpedoed by an Italian submarine on return journey. The last act of the summer was the sinking on 26 September of the Italian battleship Benedetto Brin in Brindisi harbour by Italian-speaking Austro-Hungarian saboteurs. Over 450 were killed.

In late September, the Allies established the Otranto Barrage, an attempt to blockade the entrance to the Adriatic Sea at the Strait of Otranto.

==== December ====
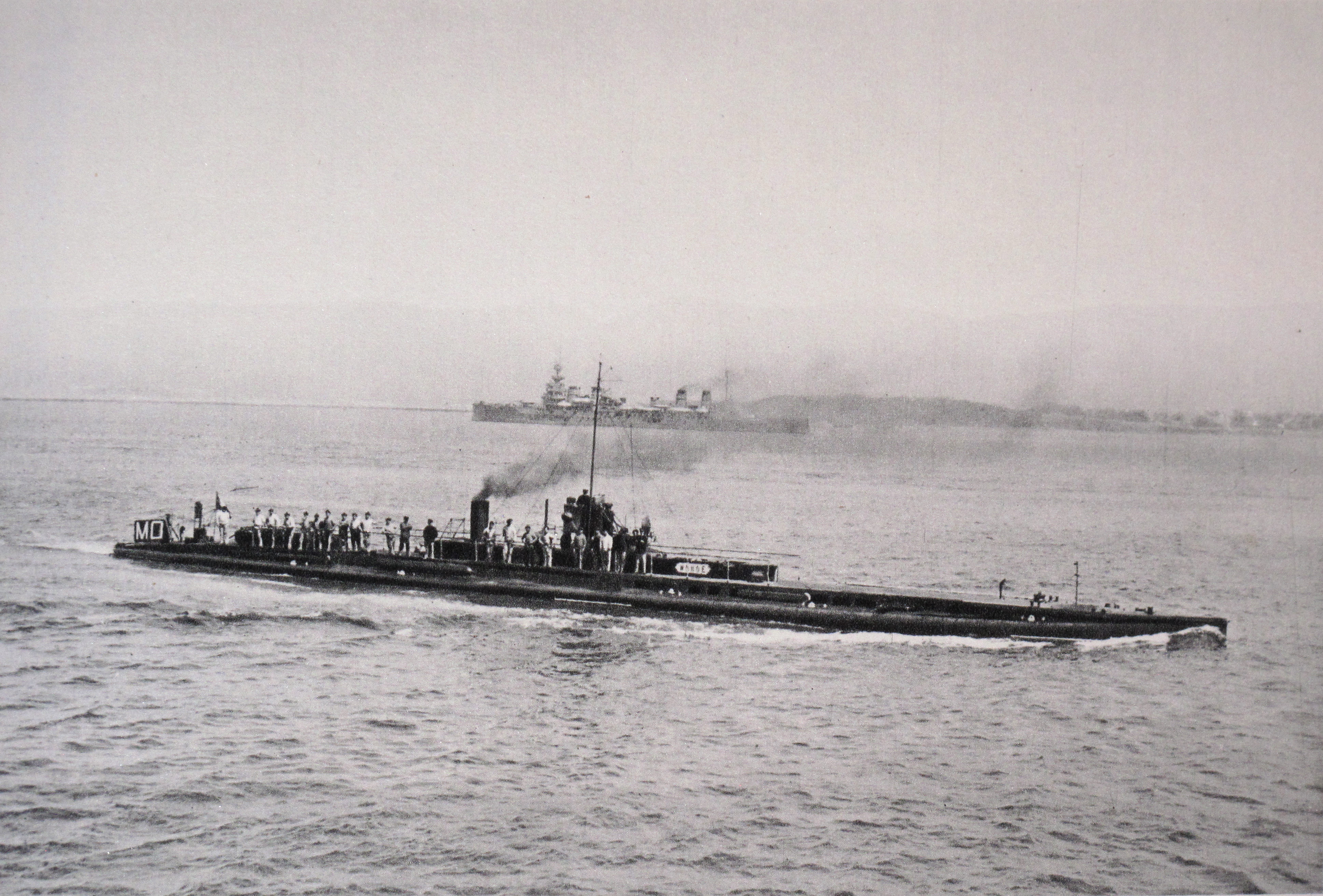
The French submarine Monge

In early December, the French submarine Fresnel ran aground off the Bojana River estuary due to bad navigation, and was sunk by the Austrian destroyer SMS Warasdiner. The cruiser Helgoland and three destroyers sortie against the Otranto Barrage from 5–22 December and performed reconnaissance off the Albanian coast and San Giovanni di Medua. They sank an Italian picket boat, three steamships loaded with ammunition and two armed schooners en route to Northern Albania.

The light cruiser SMS Helgoland and five Tatra-class destroyers left Cattaro and headed for Durazzo late on 28 December 1915. While on passage the French submarine Monge was rammed by the cruiser SMS Helgoland, and finally sunk by gunfire from the destroyer SMS Balaton. Early the next day, the Austrians squadron opened fire on Durazzo targets, sinking some small ships. Then they ran into a minefield. The destroyer Lika was sunk and Triglav was damaged. She was taken in tow and the Austrian force sailed slowly to north.

An allied force had already sailed from Brindisi, with the aim to intercept them. It was composed of the British light cruisers HMS Dartmouth and Weymouth, the Italian light cruisers RN Quarto and Nino Bixio and five French destroyers. In support of the retreating force, the Austrians despatched the armoured cruiser SMS Kaiser Karl VI and the light cruiser Novara from Cattaro. Early in the afternoon of 29 December, the forward Allied ships came into action with the retreating Austrian light squadron, which was still only halfway home. The Triglav was abandoned and scuttled and a long-range gunnery duel was fought throughout the afternoon. SMS Tatra was damaged but the Austrian light force was able to reach Cattaro safely.

=== 1916 ===
Austrian submarines sank or damaged a number of ships in 1916. U-11 captured the Italian hospital ship King Albert on 18 January at San Giovanni di Medua. U-6 sank the French destroyer Renaudin on 16 March at Durazzo. On 8 June, U-5 torpedoed and sank the Italian troop transport Principe Umberto at Linguetta. Later, U-5 fought a French-Italian destroyer group to a stalemate on 2 August, and torpedoed the Italian Q-Ship Pantelleria south of Taranto on August 14.

On 15 September 1916, the two Austro-Hungarian seaplanes L.132 and L.135 forced the French submarine Foucault to surface by dropping bombs. L.135 finally sinks the sub while the 27 survivors were clinging to the two planes now floating, to be finally saved by the alarmed Tb 100M. This was the first sinking of a submarine by airplanes in naval war history.

The very same day, the French submarine Ampére scored two torpedo hits on the Austro-Hungarian Hospital ship No I (the former Lloyd steamer Elektra) off Cape Planka (Rt Ploča), causing two fatalities. The damaged hospital ship had to be beached in Borovica Bay for further repairs.

On the night of 22/23 December, the Austro-Hungarian destroyers SMS Scharfschuetze, Reka, Dinara and Velebit attacked the drifters patrolling the Otranto barrage, which applied for help to the French destroyers Casque, Protet, Commandant Rivière, Commandant Bory, Dehorter and Boutefeu which were escorting a convoy from Brindisi to Taranto. Because of communication problems, only Casque and Commandant Rivière attacked, but Casque's boiler rooms were hit immediately and she had to slow down to 23 knots (43 km/h; 26 mph). For further assistance, the Italian destroyers Giuseppe Cesare Abba, Ippolito Nievo and Rosolino Pilo left Brindisi shortly followed by the British cruiser Gloucester escorted by Impavido and Irrequieto. The French and Italian groups met during darkness, Giuseppe Cesare Abba rammed Casque; some moments later, Boutefeu rammed Giuseppe Cesare Abba. While the damaged vessels had to be taken into tow, the Austrians escaped in the darkness.

The return from the Otranto battle—15 May 1917—brought the British cruiser HMS Dartmouth within the range of the UC-25 which had already laid mines off Brindisi.

At 13:30, UC-25 torpedoed Dartmouth approximately 36 mi (31 nmi; 58 km) off Brindisi, for some time the ship was considered to be lost, but was manned by a rescue crew later and finally towed into port. On hearing that Dartmouth had been torpedoed, Boutefeu went to assist, only to hit one of UC-25's mines.

=== 1917 ===
The Austro-Hungarian Navy had a major victory in May 1917 when it broke out of the allied naval blockade of the Adriatic Sea during the Battle of the Strait of Otranto (1917). However after this, large scale operations were limited. By August 1917, Lt. Von Trapp and U-14 had sunk more than 24,000 long tons (24,000 t) of enemy shipping, including the Italian steamer Milazzo (11,480 long tons (11,660 t)). U-4 torpedoed the French steamer Italia near Taranto on 30 May, and on 16 November U-43 severely damaged the Italian steamer Oriona between Brindisi and Valona. On the night of 9–10 December, while SMS Wien and Budapest were at anchor in Trieste, two Italian MAS (motor torpedo boats) managed to penetrate the harbour defences undetected and fired several torpedoes at the two ships. Wien was struck by two torpedoes and sank in less than five minutes with the loss of 46 of her crew.

=== 1918 ===
During the night of 10–11 February 1918, three Italian MAS boats raided the harbor at Bakar. Although the attack was materially inconsequential, it boosted Italian morale in the wake of Italy's major defeat on the Italian front in the Battle of Caporetto in October–November 1917 and was widely celebrated in Italy, where it became known as the Beffa di Buccari (Bakar mockery).

On 13 February, the submarine Bernouilli (Audry) was lost with all hands after hitting a mine off the Bocche di Cattaro.

On 5/6 April, 59 sailors and 4 cadets aboard the Austro-Hungarian torpedo boat TB 96, convoyed by the SMS Uzsok launched a failed incursion on the Port of Ancona.

On 22/23 April, the Austro-Hungarian Tátra-class destroyers SMS Triglav, SMS Uzsok, SMS Dukla, SMS Lika and SMS Csepel encountered the British destroyers HMS Jackal and Hornet, the Australian HMAS Torrens and the French Cimeterre. HMS Hornet was badly damaged in the ensuing fight but the alarm went up and the Austrians turned for home, pursued by Jackal, who had lost her mainmast.

==== The Premuda attack ====
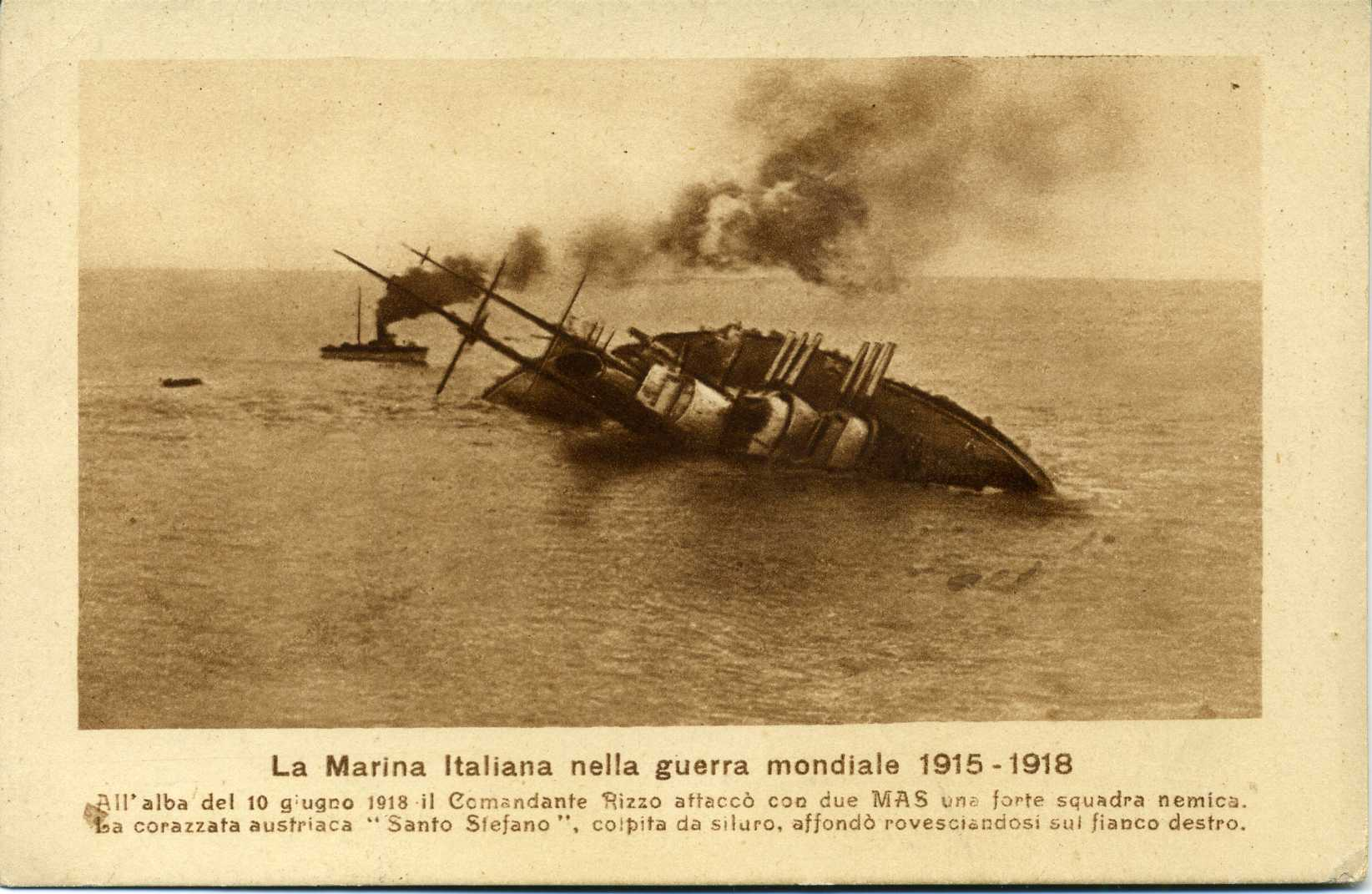
The last moments of SMS Szent István, hit by a torpedo of the Italian MAS of Luigi Rizzo

At 03:30 on the morning of 10 June 1918, the battleship Szent István—in the company of SMS Tegetthoff and seven other ships en route to attack the Otranto Barrage – was seen by chance and then hit by two torpedoes launched from the Italian MAS-15 Motor Torpedo Boat under Corvette Captain Luigi Rizzo near Premuda island, near Zara. Many of the 1,087 crew were asleep, getting rested for the battle expected in a few hours. Immediate chaos soon changed into frantic efforts to save the vessel which was rapidly shipping water. SMS Tegetthoff was hit by another torpedo from a second MAS, but it did not explode.

Then Tegetthoff—which had at first sped away from the vicinity of the torpedo attack—returned and took Szent István in tow, in an attempt to reach the massive dry dock at Pula. However, the pumps were unequal to the task before them due to loss of steam pressure and the ship continued to slowly list, sinking at 06:12, almost 3 hours after being hit.

It is debated that faults in the Tegetthoff-class design – relatively low displacement and high centre of gravity, together with the weight of twelve 305 mm (12 in) main artillery – did not assist matters. However, most other battleships in The Great War which were either torpedoed or mined sank far more rapidly. There were, however, only 89 dead, partly attributed to the fact that all sailors with the K.u.K. had to learn to swim before entering active service. The attack on the Otranto Barrage was cancelled as a consequence of this attack.

On 20 September, the French submarine Circé was torpedoed 7 nmi (13 km; 8.1 mi) north west of Cape Rodoni by the Austro-Hungarian submarine U-47 and lost with all hands.

==== Second Battle of Durazzo ====
On 2 October, an allied fleet composed of Italian, British, Australian and American warships attacked the port of Durazzo, which had by that time come under Austro-Hungarian occupation, during the Second Battle of Durazzo. The fleet consisted of over 55 vessels along with MAS boats and supporting aircraft. Allied forces destroyed Austro-Hungarian shore batteries and defeated a small squadron of patrol craft while sustaining comparatively light damage. Durazzo was left in flames, several building, bridges and railroad targets were bombarded which forced the evacuation of the city. A week or so after the battle an allied army occupied the city without resistance.

==== Sinking of Viribus Unitis ====
On 1 November, the ex-Austro-Hungarian dreadnought flagship Viribus Unitis was sunk – along with the merchant-ship Wien— both at anchor at Pula by limpet mine attached by the crew of an Italian mignatta. The mignatta was the precursor of the human torpedo and was invented by Major of naval engineers Raffaele Rossetti.

The whole Austro-Hungarian Navy was at the time being transferred to the new State of Slovenes, Croats and Serbs, but the Italian attackers had not been informed.

==== Allied occupation of the eastern Adriatic ====
In the final days of the war, Allied forces occupied the eastern Adriatic. The occupation generally encompassed Julian March, Dalmatia, and the coastal areas of the Kingdom of Montenegro. The occupied area was partitioned in four zones: British, French, American, and Italian. The latter largely corresponded to the territorial award under the 1915 Treaty of London. The occupation was a part of efforts to address the Adriatic question of determination of borders of Italy in the Adriatic. Certain elements of the occupation were significant in resolution of the Fiume question (concerning political future of the city of Rijeka/Fiume) and the Montenegrin question (concerning preservation of independence of that kingdom). The occupation concluded in 1921.

== Austro-Hungarian submarine results ==
Many Austro-Hungarian and German U-boats operated out of the Adriatic for the whole of the war. Due to lack of cooperation of the Allies in the Mediterranean control zones, and the late institution of the convoy system, U-boats experienced substantial success throughout the first war years.

Austro-Hungarian submarines sunk 117 ships during World War I, a total of 220,121 long tons (223,653 t). The most well-known casualties were:

- Léon Gambetta
- Giuseppe Garibaldi
- Nereide
- Renaudin
- Fourche
- Impetuoso
- Nembo
- HMS Phoenix
- Circé

Also, the K.u.K. Kriegsmarine submarines damaged the following ships:

- Jean Bart
- HMS Dublin
- Sakaki
- HMS Weymouth

Tonnes sunk by K.u.K. Kriegsmarine submarines
Year	1914	1915	1916	1917	1918
Tonnage	13	22,568	25,716	112,716	58,902
