= French destroyer Commandant Bory =

Destroyer of the French Navy

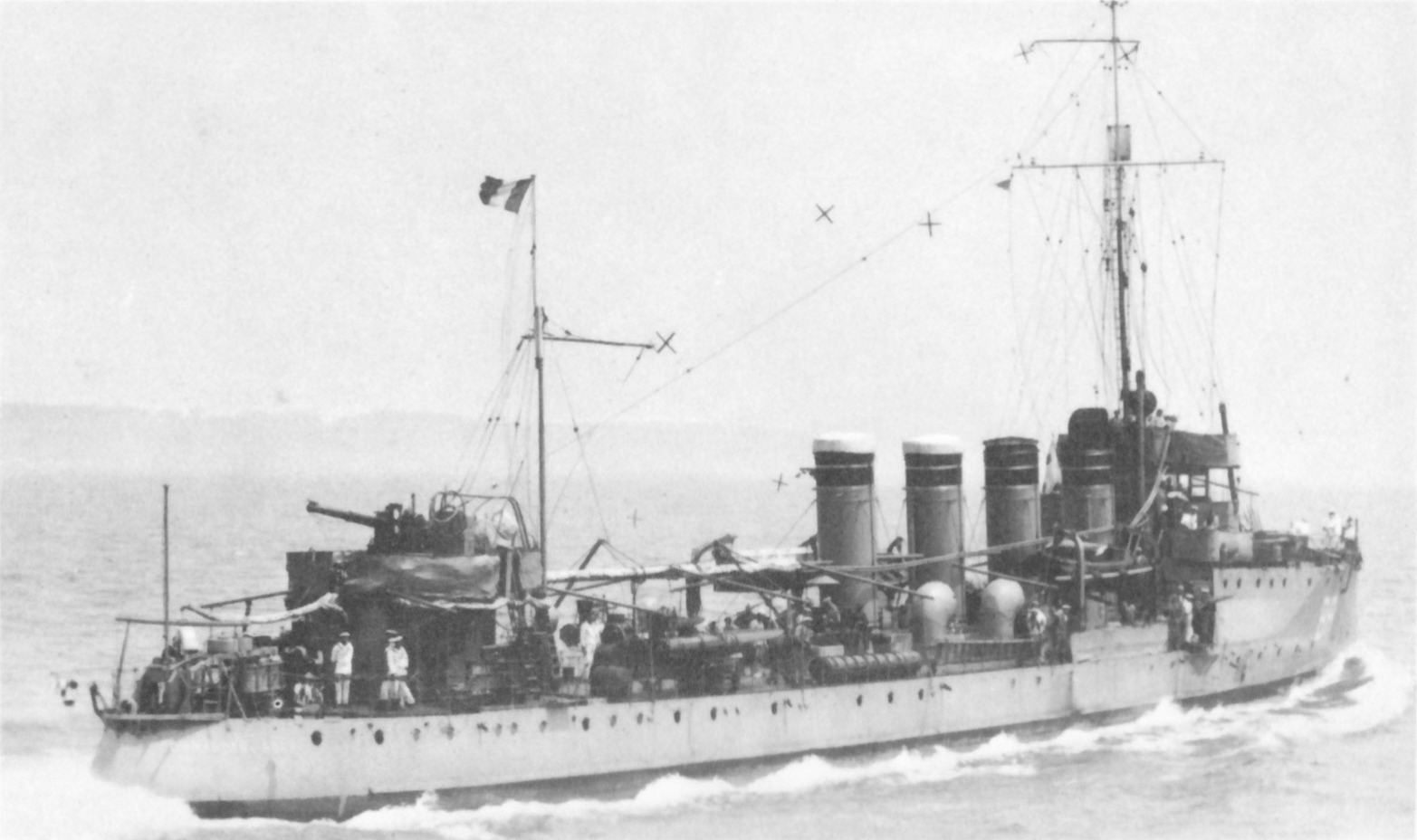
- Commandant Bory in 1912

History

France
- Name: Commandant Bory
- Builder: Dyle et Bacalan, Bordeaux
- Laid down: 1910
- Launched: 14 September 1912
- Completed: 1913
- Stricken: 27 July 1926

General characteristics (as built)
- Class & type: Bouclier-class destroyer
- Displacement: 720–756 t (709–744 long tons)
- Length: 72.3–78.3 m (237 ft 2 in – 256 ft 11 in) (o/a)
- Beam: 7.6–8 m (24 ft 11 in – 26 ft 3 in)
- Draft: 2.9–3.3 m (9 ft 6 in – 10 ft 10 in)
- Installed power: 4 water-tube boilers; 13,000 shp (9,694 kW)
- Propulsion: 2 shafts; 2 steam turbines
- Speed: 30 knots (56 km/h; 35 mph)
- Range: 1,200–1,600 nmi (2,200–3,000 km; 1,400–1,800 mi) at 12–14 knots (22–26 km/h; 14–16 mph)
- Complement: 80–83
- Armament: 2 × 100 mm (3.9 in) Mle 1893 guns; 4 × 65 mm (2.6 in) Mle 1902 guns; 2 × twin 450 mm (17.7 in) torpedo tubes

Commandant Bory was one of a dozen Bouclier-class destroyers built for the French Navy in the first decade of the 20th century.

== Design and description ==
The Bouclier class were designed to a general specification and varied significantly from each other in various ways. The ships had an overall length of 74–78.3 meters (242 ft 9 in – 256 ft 11 in), a beam of 7.6–8 meters (24 ft 11 in – 26 ft 3 in), and a draft of 2.9–3.1 meters (9 ft 6 in – 10 ft 2 in). Designed to displace 800 metric tons (787 long tons), they displaced 720–756 t (709–744 long tons) at normal load. Their crew numbered 80–83 men.

Commandant Bory was powered by a pair of Rateau steam turbines, each driving one propeller shaft using steam provided by four water-tube boilers. The engines were designed to produce 13,000 shaft horsepower (9,700 kW) which was intended to give the ships a speed of 30 knots (56 km/h; 35 mph). Commandant Bory exceeded that speed, reaching 30.7 knots (56.9 km/h; 35.3 mph) during her sea trials. The ships carried enough fuel oil to give them a range of 1,200–1,600 nautical miles (2,200–3,000 km; 1,400–1,800 mi) at cruising speeds of 12–14 knots (22–26 km/h; 14–16 mph).

The primary armament of the Bouclier-class ships consisted of two 100-millimeter (3.9 in) Modèle 1893 guns in single mounts, one each fore and aft of the superstructure, and four 65-millimeter (2.6 in) Modèle 1902 guns distributed amidships. They were also fitted with two twin mounts for 450-millimeter (17.7 in) torpedo tubes amidships.

During World War I, a 45-millimeter (1.8 in) or 75-millimeter (3 in) anti-aircraft gun, two 8-millimeter (0.31 in) machine guns, and eight or ten Guiraud-type depth charges were added to the ships. The extra weight severely overloaded the ships and reduced their operational speed to around 26 knots (48 km/h; 30 mph).

== Construction and career ==
Commandant Bory was ordered from Dyle et Bacalan and was launched from its Bordeaux shipyard on 14 September 1912. The ship was completed the following year.

When the First World War began in August 1914, Commandant Bory was assigned to the 6th Destroyer Flotilla (6^{e} escadrille de torpilleurs) of the 1st Naval Army (^{1ère} Armée Navale). (Note: Prévoteaux lists Commandant Bory as still conducting her sea trials on 1 August. Exactly when those were completed and the ship entered active service is unknown.) During the preliminary stages of the Battle of Antivari, Montenegro, on 16 August, the 1st, 4th and 5th Destroyer Flotillas were tasked to escort the core of the 1st Naval Army while the 2nd, 3rd and 6th Flotillas escorted the armored cruisers of the 2nd Light Squadron (2^{e} escadre légère) and two British cruisers. After reuniting both groups and spotting the Austro-Hungarian protected cruiser SMS Zenta and the destroyer SMS Ulan, the French destroyers played no role in sinking the cruiser, although the 4th Flotilla was sent on an unsuccessful pursuit of Ulan. Having broken the Austro-Hungarian blockade of Antivari (now known as Bar), Vice-Admiral (Vice-amiral) Augustin Boué de Lapeyrère, commander of the 1st Naval Army, decided to ferry troops and supplies to the port using a small requisitioned passenger ship, SS Liamone, escorted by the 2nd Light Squadron, reinforced by the armored cruiser Ernest Renan, and escorted by the destroyer Bouclier with the 1st and 6th Destroyer Flotillas under command while the rest of the 1st Naval Army bombarded the Austro-Hungarian naval base at Cattaro, Montenegro, on 1 September. Four days later, the fleet covered the evacuation of Danilo, Crown Prince of Montenegro, aboard Bouclier, to the Greek island of Corfu. The flotilla escorted multiple small convoys loaded with supplies and equipment to Antivari, beginning in October and lasting for the rest of the year, always covered by the larger ships of the Naval Army in futile attempts to lure the Austro-Hungarian fleet into battle. Amidst these missions, the 1st and 6th Flotillas were led by the French destroyer Dehorter as they conducted a sweep south of Cattaro on the night of 10/11 November in an unsuccessful search for Austro-Hungarian destroyers.

The torpedoing of the French battleship Jean Bart on 21 December caused a change in French tactics as the battleships were too important to risk to submarine attack. Henceforth, only the destroyers would escort the transports, covered by cruisers at a distance of 20–50 miles (32–80 km) from the transports. The first convoy of 1915 to Antivari arrived on 11 January and more were made until the last one on 20–21 April. After Italy signed the Treaty of London and declared war on the Austro-Hungarian Empire on 23 May, the ship was still assigned to the 6th Flotilla when the unit was transferred to the 1st Division of Destroyers and Submarines (1^{ère} division de torpilleurs et de sous-marines) of the 2nd Squadron (escadre) based at Brindisi, Italy.

While returning from an attack on a suspected Austro-Hungarian submarine base in the Gulf of Drin by a mixed group of Italian, British and French cruisers and destroyers on 9 June, the British light cruiser HMS Dublin was torpedoed by the submarine U-4. The close escort managed to drive the submarine away, and Dublin successfully reached Brindisi without further damage. Commandant Bory was not part of the close escort of the cruiser and unsuccessfully pursued the submarine. On 12 July, the 6th Destroyer Flotilla, including Commandant Bory, was part of the force that raided the island of Lastovo off the Austrian coast of the Adriatic (now part of Croatia), destroying oil stores and the telegraph station. This attack was simultaneous with the Italian occupation of Palagruža.

== Bibliography ==
- Couhat, Jean Labayle (1974). French Warships of World War I. London: Ian Allan Publishing. ISBN 0-7110-0445-5.
- Freivogel, Zvonimir (2019). The Great War in the Adriatic Sea 1914–1918. Zagreb: Despot Infinitus. ISBN 978-953-8218-40-8.
- Monograph No. 21: The Mediterranean 1914–1915 (PDF). Naval Staff Monographs (Historical). Vol. VIII. The Naval Staff, Training and Staff Duties Division. 1923.
- Prévoteaux, Gérard (2017). La marine française dans la Grande guerre: les combattants oubliés: Tome I 1914–1915 [The French Navy during the Great War: The Forgotten Combatants, Book I 1914–1915]. Collection Navires & Histoire des Marines du Mond. Vol. 23. Le Vigen, France: Éditions Lela presse. ISBN 978-2-37468-000-2.
- Prévoteaux, Gérard (2017). La marine française dans la Grande guerre: les combattants oubliés: Tome II 1916–1918 [The French Navy during the Great War: The Forgotten Combatants, Book II 1916–1918]. Collection Navires & Histoire des Marines du Mond. Vol. 27. Le Vigen, France: Éditions Lela presse. ISBN 978-2-37468-001-9.
- Roberts, Stephen S. (2021). French Warships in the Age of Steam 1859–1914: Design, Construction, Careers and Fates. Barnsley, UK: Seaforth Publishing. ISBN 978-1-5267-4533-0.
- Smigielski, Adam (1985). "France". In Gray, Randal (ed.). Conway's All the World's Fighting Ships 1906–1921. Annapolis, Maryland: Naval Institute Press. pp. 190–220. ISBN 0-87021-907-3.
