= Balilla (disambiguation) =

Balilla may refer to:

- Balilla, the nickname of Giovan Battista Perasso, a Genoese boy who started the revolt of 1746 against the Habsburg forces that occupied the city
- Fiat Balilla, a compact car designed and developed by Fiat in 1932
- Italian submarine Balilla
- Balilla Lombardi, an Italian professional football player
- Opera Nazionale Balilla, an Italian Fascist youth organization functioning between 1926 and 1937
- Balilla-class submarine, the first submarines to be built for the Italian navy following the end of World War I.
- Francesco Balilla Pratella, an Italian composer, musicologist and essayist

== See also ==
- Badilla (disambiguation)
- Barillas (disambiguation)
