= Italian submarine Primo Longobardo =

Primo Longobardo was the name of at least two ships of the Italian Navy named in honour of Primo Longobardo and may refer to:

- Italian submarine Primo Longobardo (S 501), a Tench-class submarine launched in 1944 as the USS Pickerel. Transferred to Italy and renamed in 1972.
- Italian submarine Primo Longobardo (S 524), a Sauro-class submarine launched in 1992.
