= Primo Longobardo =

Italian naval officer (1901–1942)

- Born: 19 October 1901; La Maddalena, Kingdom of Italy
- Died: 15 July 1942 (aged 40); Atlantic Ocean
- Military career
- Allegiance: Kingdom of Italy
- Branch: Regia Marina
- Service years: 1915–1942
- Rank: Commander
- Commands: Fratelli Bandiera (submarine); Sirena (submarine); Galileo Galilei (submarine); Galileo Ferraris (submarine); Enrico Toti (submarine); Luigi Torelli (submarine); Pietro Calvi (submarine)
- Conflicts: Spanish Civil War; World War II; Battle of the Mediterranean; Battle of the Atlantic
- Awards: Gold Medal of Military Valor (posthumous); Silver Medal of Military Valor (twice)

Primo Longobardo (19 October 1901 – 14 July 1942) was an Italian naval officer and submariner during World War II.

== Biography ==
He was born in La Maddalena on 19 October 1901, the son of Vincenzo Longobardo and Ersilia Culiolo, and enrolled at the Naval Academy of Livorno in 1915, graduating as ensign on 8 July 1920 after participating in training cruises aboard the training ship Amerigo Vespucci. He was promoted to sub-lieutenant in 1922 and to lieutenant in 1925; in 1929 he was sent to Tianjin, where he assumed the post of deputy commander of the Regia Marina detachment at the Italian Legation until 1932. After being repatriated, he attended the Command School aboard the submarine H 4 and was promoted to lieutenant commander in 1933.

He then obtained his first command, submarine Fratelli Bandiera, followed by Sirena in 1934, Galileo Galilei from July 1935 to January 1937, and Galileo Ferraris and Pietro Calvi during the Spanish Civil War, in which he carried out patrols against Republican shipping and was awarded a Silver Medal of Military Valor for the sinking of the Republican steamer Navarra. On 1 January 1938 he was promoted to commander and assigned to the Submarine Office of the Navy Ministry; he was later transferred to the command of the 2nd Submarine Group of Naples and then of the 6 th Submarine Group of Tobruk from April to July 1939.

At the outbreak of the Second World War Longobardo held the command of the 3rd Submarine Group of Messina. In the early part of the war he commanded the submarine Enrico Toti, carrying out patrols in the Mediterranean, and in October 1940 (after participating in one of U 99's patrols alongside Otto Kretschmer, as an observer) he assumed command of Luigi Torelli, participating in the battle of the Atlantic with base in Bordeaux (BETASOM). In command of Torelli, Longobardo carried out two Atlantic patrols; the first one, in December 1940, had to be aborted soon after departure due to mechanical breakdowns, but the second one, in January–February 1941, resulted in the sinking of four merchant vessels (Urla, Nemea, Brask, and Nicolaos Filinis) for a gross tonnage of 17,498 GRT, the most successful patrol for a Betasom boat until then. Longobardo was therefore awarded another Silver Medal of Military Valor; however, due to his age, deemed too old for the hardships entailed by an active submarine command (40 years old), he was then replaced and given command of the Submarine School of Pola (12th Submarine Group).

Nonetheless, Longobardo repeatedly asked to be allowed to return to the frontline on a submarine, and in June 1942 he was given command of Pietro Calvi, whose commanding officer had fallen ill. On 2 July 1942 Calvi sailed from Bordeaux for a patrol in the Atlantic, and on 15 July it attacked convoy SL. 115 southwest of the Azores, being however located and hunted by HMS Lulworth. Calvi was heavily depth charged and seriously damaged, leading Longobardo to order to surface in an attempt to escape at full speed while fighting off the sloop with the submarine's deck guns. After surfacing, Calvi was immediately targeted by Lulworth's machine gunners, which cut down most of the Italian gunners; the submarine unsuccessfully fired two torpedoes at Lulworth and then evaded two ramming attempts by the British vessels, but the third attempt succeeded in destroying one of Calvi's propellers, leaving the submarine dead in the water. At this point Longobardo gave order to open the seacocks to scuttle the boat, and to gather on deck to abandon ship; immediately thereafter, however, he was killed when Calvi's conning tower was hit by one of Lulworth's shells. Shortly thereafter, Calvi sank with the loss of 42 of her 77 crew, as well as one British officer who had led a boarding party in an unsuccessful attempt to capture the submarine after Longobardo's death. At age 40 and with his rank of commander, Longobardo was both the oldest and most senior Italian submarine commander killed in World War II, as most other submarine commanders were younger lieutenant commanders or lieutenants. He was posthumously awarded the Gold Medal of Military Valor; the postwar Italian Navy named two submarines after him, the former USS Pickerel (in service from 1972 to 1981) and a Sauro-class submarine commissioned in 1993.
