= Italian submarine Enrico Toti =

Enrico Toti this name has been borne by at least two ships of the Italian Navy and may refer to:

- Italian submarine Enrico Toti (1928), a Balilla-class submarine launched in 1928 and decommissioned in 1943.
- Italian submarine Enrico Toti (S 506), a Toti-class submarine launched in 1967 and decommissioned in 1992.
