= Enrico Toti =

Italian cyclist and Bersaglieri

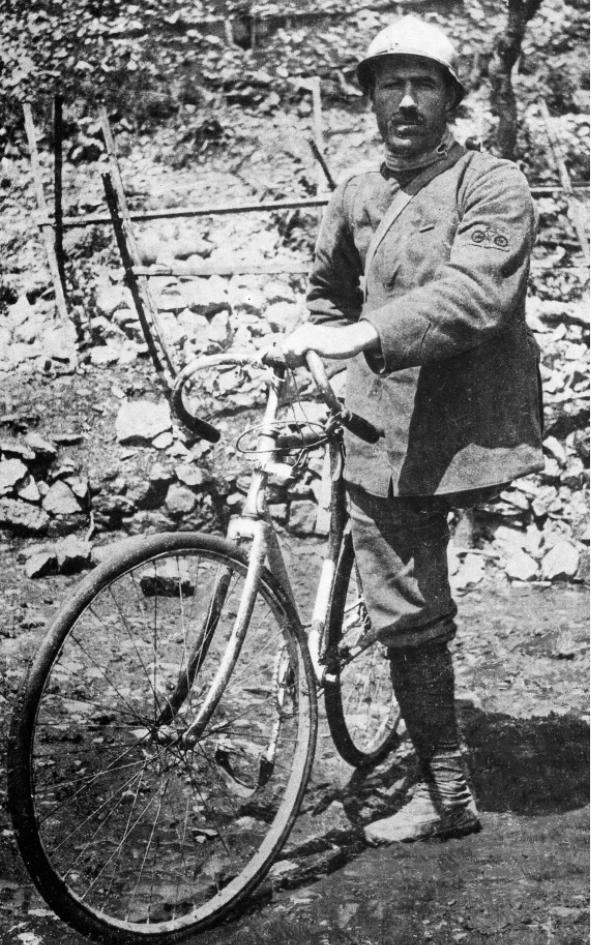
- Born: 20 August 1882; Rome, Italy
- Died: 6 August 1916 (aged 33); Monfalcone, Friuli-Venezia Giulia, Italy
- Burial place: Chamber of Deputies
- Military career
- Allegiance: Kingdom of Italy
- Branch: Royal Italian Army
- Rank: Bersaglieri
- Conflicts: World War I: Sixth Battle of the Isonzo
- Awards: Gold Medal of Military Valour
- Other work: Railwayman, cyclist

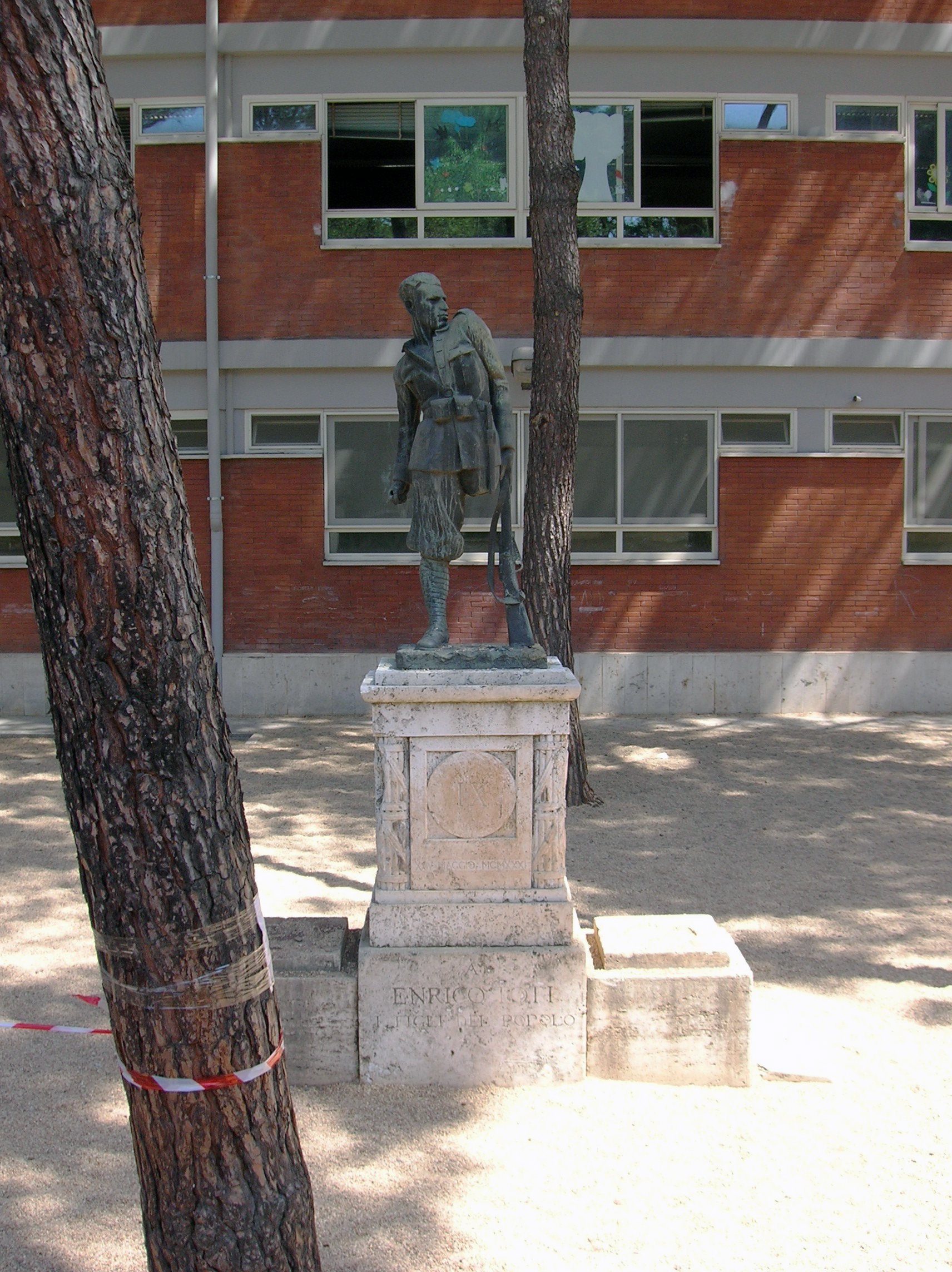
Statue of Enrico Toti in Rome.

Enrico Toti (20 August 1882 in Rome – 6 August 1916 in Monfalcone) was an Italian cyclist, patriot and hero of World War I.

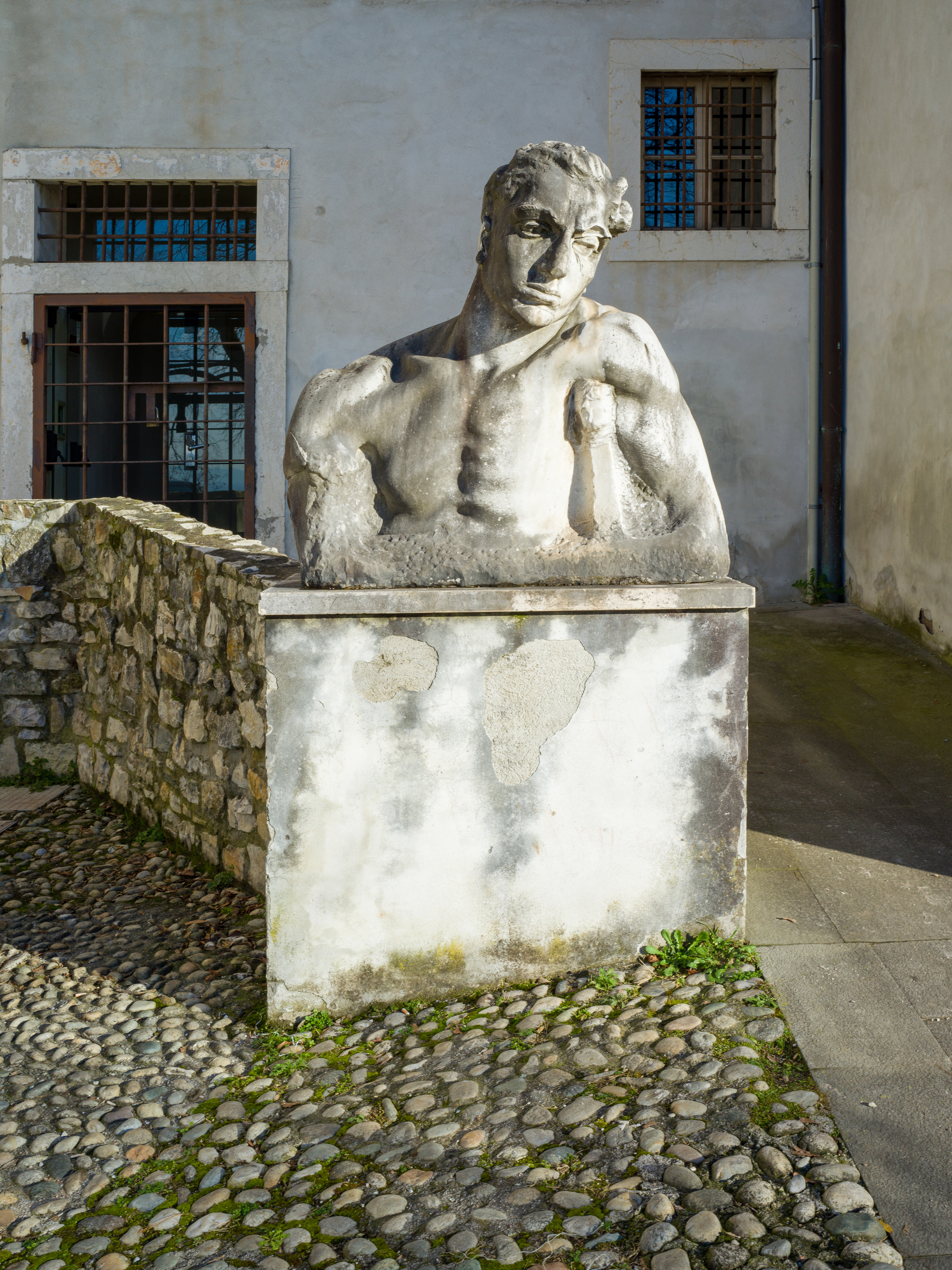
Bust of Enrico Toti in the Castle of Brescia.

== Life ==
Enrico Toti was born and raised in San Giovanni, a popular district of Rome, by his father Nicola Toti, a railway worker from Cassino, and his mother, Semira Calabresi, from Palestrina. In 1897, when he was 15, he embarked as a hub on the Ettore Fieramosca training ship, then moved on to the battleship Emanuele Filiberto and finally to the cruiser Coatit. In 1904 he was involved in clashes on the Red Sea against the pirates who infested the sea in front of the Italian colony of Eritrea. After leaving in 1905, Toti was hired by the State Railways as a stoker.

On 27 March 1908, while working on the lubrication of a locomotive, which had stopped at the Colleferro station to connect to another locomotive and to refuel with water, due to the movement of the two machines Toti slipped, remaining with his left leg stuck and crushed by gears. Immediately taken to hospital, his limb was amputated at the level of the pelvis. After losing his job, Toti devoted himself to countless activities including the realization of some small inventions now kept in Rome, in the Historical Museum of the Bersaglieri.

In 1911, cycling with one leg, he travelled to Paris, and then through Belgium, the Netherlands, and Denmark, up to Finland and Lapland. From there, via Russia and Poland, he returned to Italy in June 1912. In January 1913, Toti started cycling again, this time in Egypt; from Alexandria, he reached the border with Sudan where the English authorities, considering the trail too dangerous, ordered him to end the journey, and sent him to Cairo where he came back to Italy.

== World War I ==
When war broke out between Italy and the Austro-Hungarian Empire, Toti tried to volunteer for the Italian army but was not accepted due to his injury. Undaunted, he reached the frontline with his bicycle and managed to serve as an unpaid, unregistered, fully non-regulation "civilian volunteer" attached to several units. Forced to leave the combat zone and return home by the Carabinieri (Military Police), Toti stubbornly returned to the front and finally managed to join (still unofficially) the 3rd Bersaglieri Bicycle Battalion. He was killed in the Sixth Battle of the Isonzo. Fatally wounded in a clash, he hurled his crutch at the enemy. Before falling on the ground he shouted: "Nun moro io!" (romanesco vernacular for "I do not die!").

== Legacy ==
He was posthumously awarded the Gold Medal of Military Valor (Italy's highest award for valour) by Victor Emmanuel III himself, but was not registered as a soldier due to his inability, "So that his glorious and heroic memory may be passed on to future generations". However, doubts remain about the real event of the fact, which was never completely clarified. The Fascist regime, in the following years, exalted the figure of Toti for propaganda purposes.

Two submarines of the Italian Navy were named after Enrico Toti:

- Enrico Toti, a Balilla-class submarine, built for the Regia Marina in 1925. She sank HMS Triad in 1940.
- Enrico Toti, a Toti-class submarine, built in 1968 for the Marina Militare, preserved as a museum ship in Milan.

There is a street in the Italian town of San Cesareo outside Rome that is named 'Via Enrico Toti' after him.

== Quote ==
"How many times at night were our projectors used only to illuminate the enemies that came out to help the wounded and bury the dead; we could have destroyed them, yet a sense of pity urged us to help them"

(Enrico Toti in a letter to home in 1916)
