= Italian submarine Balilla =

Italian submarine Balilla may refer to one of the following Italian submarines:

- Balilla (1915) was the former German U-42, acquired in 1915 by the Regia Marina and sunk in July 1916.
- Balilla (1927) was the lead boat of the Balilla-class submarines, built in 1927 and laid up in 1941.
