= Pacinotti =

Pacinotti may refer to:

== People ==
- Antonio Pacinotti (1841 – 1912), Italian physicist
- Gianni Pacinotti (born 1963), Italian cartoonist, filmmaker, and author better known by the pseudonym of Gipi
- Niccolò Pacinotti (born 1995), Italian cyclist

== Submarines ==
- Pacinotti-class submarines, two submarines launched in 1916 for the Royal Italian Navy
