= Italian submarine Enrico Toti (1928) =

Submarines built for the Royal Italian Navy

History

Italy
- Name: Enrico Toti
- Namesake: Enrico Toti
- Builder: Odero-Terni-Orlando, Muggiano
- Laid down: 26 January 1925
- Launched: 14 April 1928
- Completed: 19 September 1928
- Decommissioned: 2 April 1943
- Motto: Vincere ad ogni costo (Win at all costs)
- Nickname(s): Toti
- Fate: Scrapped

General characteristics (as built)
- Class & type: Balilla-class submarine
- Displacement: 1,450 t (1,427 long tons) (surfaced); 1,904 t (1,874 long tons) (submerged)
- Length: 86.5 m (283 ft 10 in)
- Beam: 7.8 m (25 ft 7 in)
- Draft: 4.7 m (15 ft 5 in)
- Installed power: 4,900 bhp (3,700 kW) (diesels); 2,200 hp (1,600 kW) (electric motors)
- Propulsion: 2 shafts; diesel-electric; 2 × diesel engines; 2 × electric motors
- Speed: 17.5 knots (32.4 km/h; 20.1 mph) (surfaced); 8.9 knots (16.5 km/h; 10.2 mph) (submerged)
- Range: 12,000 nmi (22,000 km; 14,000 mi) at 7 knots (13 km/h; 8.1 mph) (surfaced); 110 nmi (200 km; 130 mi) at 3 knots (5.6 km/h; 3.5 mph) (submerged)
- Test depth: 110 m (350 ft)
- Complement: 77
- Armament: 1 × single 120 mm (4.7 in) deck gun; 2 × single 13.2 mm (0.52 in) machine guns; 6 × 533 mm (21 in) torpedo tubes (4 bow, 2 stern)

Enrico Toti was one of four Balilla-class submarines built for the Regia Marina (Royal Italian Navy) during the late 1920s. The boat played a minor role in the Spanish Civil War of 1936–1939 supporting the Spanish Nationalists. She was the only Italian submarine to have sunk a Royal Navy submarine during the Second World War.

== Design and description ==
The Balilla-class submarines were the first cruiser submarines built for the Regia Marina. They displaced 1,450 metric tons (1,427 long tons) surfaced and 1,904 metric tons (1,874 long tons) submerged. The submarines were 86.5 meters (283 ft 10 in) long, had a beam of 7.8 meters (25 ft 7 in) and a draft of 4.7 meters (15 ft 5 in). They had an operational diving depth of 110 meters (360 ft). Their crew numbered 77 officers and enlisted men.

For surface running, the boats were powered by two 2,450-brake-horsepower (1,827 kW) diesel engines, each driving one propeller shaft. When submerged each propeller was driven by a 1,100-horsepower (820 kW) electric motor. The submarines were also fitted with an auxiliary diesel cruising engine that gave them a speed of 7 knots (13 km/h; 8.1 mph) on the surface. They could reach a maximum speed of 17.5 knots (32.4 km/h; 20.1 mph) on the surface and 8 knots (15 km/h; 9.2 mph) underwater. On the surface, the Balilla class had a range of 12,000 nautical miles (22,000 km; 14,000 mi) at 7 knots; submerged, they had a range of 110 nmi (200 km; 130 mi) at 3 knots (5.6 km/h; 3.5 mph).

The boats were armed with six internal 53.3-centimeter (21 in) torpedo tubes, four in the bow and two in the stern, for which they carried a dozen torpedoes. They were also armed with a single 120-millimeter (4.7 in) deck gun, forward of the conning tower, for combat on the surface. Their anti-aircraft armament consisted of two 13.2-millimeter (0.52 in) machine guns.

== Construction and service ==
Enrico Toti was laid down on 26 January 1925 at the Odero-Terni-Orlando shipyard in Muggiano, La Spezia. She was launched on 14 April 1928 and completed on 19 September. She was named after Enrico Toti, a First World War combatant posthumously awarded the Italian Gold Medal. A notable peacetime mission of Enrico Toti was the circumnavigation of Africa in 1934 along with her sister ship Antonio Sciesa. During the Spanish Civil War, the submarine unsuccessfully attacked the 1,011-gross register ton (GRT) cargo ship SS Bétis on 9 August 1937 during a patrol off Valencia.

During the Second World War Enrico Toti was assigned to the Italian 4th Submarine Group's 40th Squadron.

=== The sinking of HMS Triad ===
HMS Triad was a T-class submarine of the Royal Navy that had set sail from Malta on 9 October 1940 under the command of Lieutenant-Commander G.S. Salt to join the 1st Submarine Flotilla at Alexandria. In the early hours of 15 October at 38°16′N 17°37′E, off the Gulf of Taranto, she encountered the Enrico Toti, commanded by Lieutenant-Commander Bandino Bandini.

Bandini, the officer on watch at the time, sighted the Triad on the surface at 01:00, and sounded battle stations on board the Italian submarine. Both submarines altered course until they were heading towards each other.

Italian accounts record that the British submarine was the first to open fire with her deck gun, but she overshot. Triad also fired one torpedo, which the Italian ship turned to avoid. Bandini's vessel opened fire on the British deck guns with her four 13.2 mm (0.52 in) machine guns, preventing the Royal Navy personnel from operating their deck gun and driving them below deck. Accounts show that the two submarines passed within four yards, with Triad cutting across the stern of the Italian vessel.

In an account of the engagement published in 1940, Italian writer and then navy war correspondent Dino Buzzati, who interviewed the Enrico Toti officers and crew after their return to base, reports that both submarines were so close that an Italian gunner, furious because he could not yet train the gun to the British submarine, actually threw his shoes at the head of a British gunner.

Enrico Toti launched a torpedo; however it caused no damage to the British submarine. At this stage, Lieutenant-Commander Salt began to dive his ship, however she was sunk during this manoeuvre by two direct shell hits from the 120 mm gun.

First Lieutenant Giovanni Cunsolo writes: "The submarine sinks, then in a desperate attempt to escape she tries to surface, stern-first, but soon after she disappears under the surface of the sea."

The time from first sighting until sinking was 30 to 45 minutes, and there were no survivors picked up by the Italian submarine or any other vessels. For this action, the entire crew and their commander received an award.

From March to June 1942, Enrico Toti was transferred to the Italian naval base at Pola, where she carried out 93 training sorties. She was later deployed to transport supplies to Italian forces in North Africa. The submarine accomplished four round missions to Libya carrying 194 ton of cargo. Decommissioned on 1 April 1943, Enrico Toti was converted into a blockship at Taranto, her hull being used as submarines' battery charger.

=== HMS Rainbow ===
It was long believed that HMS Triad had been sunk by a mine, and that the ship sunk by the Enrico Toti was in fact the R-class submarine HMS Rainbow, which was patrolling nearby and had not been in contact. However, research in 1988 by the Royal Navy came to the conclusion that HMS Rainbow had been sunk in a collision with the Italian cargo ship Antonietta Costa which was part of an Italian convoy sailing back to Bari from Valona on 4 October 1940.

== See also ==
- Italian submarines of World War II

== Bibliography ==
- Bagnasco, Erminio (1977). Submarines of World War Two. Annapolis, Maryland: Naval Institute Press. ISBN 0-87021-962-6.
- Brescia, Maurizio (2012). Mussolini's Navy: A Reference Guide to the Regina Marina 1930–45. Annapolis, Maryland: Naval Institute Press. ISBN 978-1-59114-544-8.
- Chesneau, Roger, ed. (1980). Conway's All the World's Fighting Ships 1922–1946. Greenwich, UK: Conway Maritime Press. ISBN 0-85177-146-7.
- Frank, Willard C. Jr. (1989). "Question 12/88". Warship International. XXVI (1): 95–97. ISSN 0043-0374.
- Fraccaroli, Aldo (1968). Italian Warships of World War II. Shepperton, UK: Ian Allan. ISBN 0-7110-0002-6.
- Giorgerini, Giorgio (2002). Uomini sul fondo. Storia del sommergibilismo italiano dalle origini a oggi (in Italian). Mondadori. ISBN 978-88-04-50537-2.
- Rohwer, Jürgen (2005). Chronology of the War at Sea 1939–1945: The Naval History of World War Two (Third Revised ed.). Annapolis, Maryland: Naval Institute Press. ISBN 1-59114-119-2.
