= Barillas (disambiguation) =

Barillas is a surname of Spanish origin and may refer to:

== People ==
- Armando Morales Barillas (January 1936 – July 24, 1984), better known as Armando Morales Barillas, was a Nicaraguan classical guitarist born in the town of Esquipulas in Nicaragua.
- Carlos Lopez-Barillas, Guatemalan-born photographer who has been living and working in the United Kingdom since 1996.
- Manuel Barillas (1845 – 1907), acting president of Guatemala from 6 April 1885 to 15 March 1886 and President from 16 March 1886 to 15 March 1892.

== Places ==
- Barillas is a town and municipality located in the province and autonomous community of Navarre, northern Spain.
- Estadio Armando Barillas is a soccer stadium located in Escuintla, Guatemala.
