= Brazilian submarine Humaytá =

Submarine

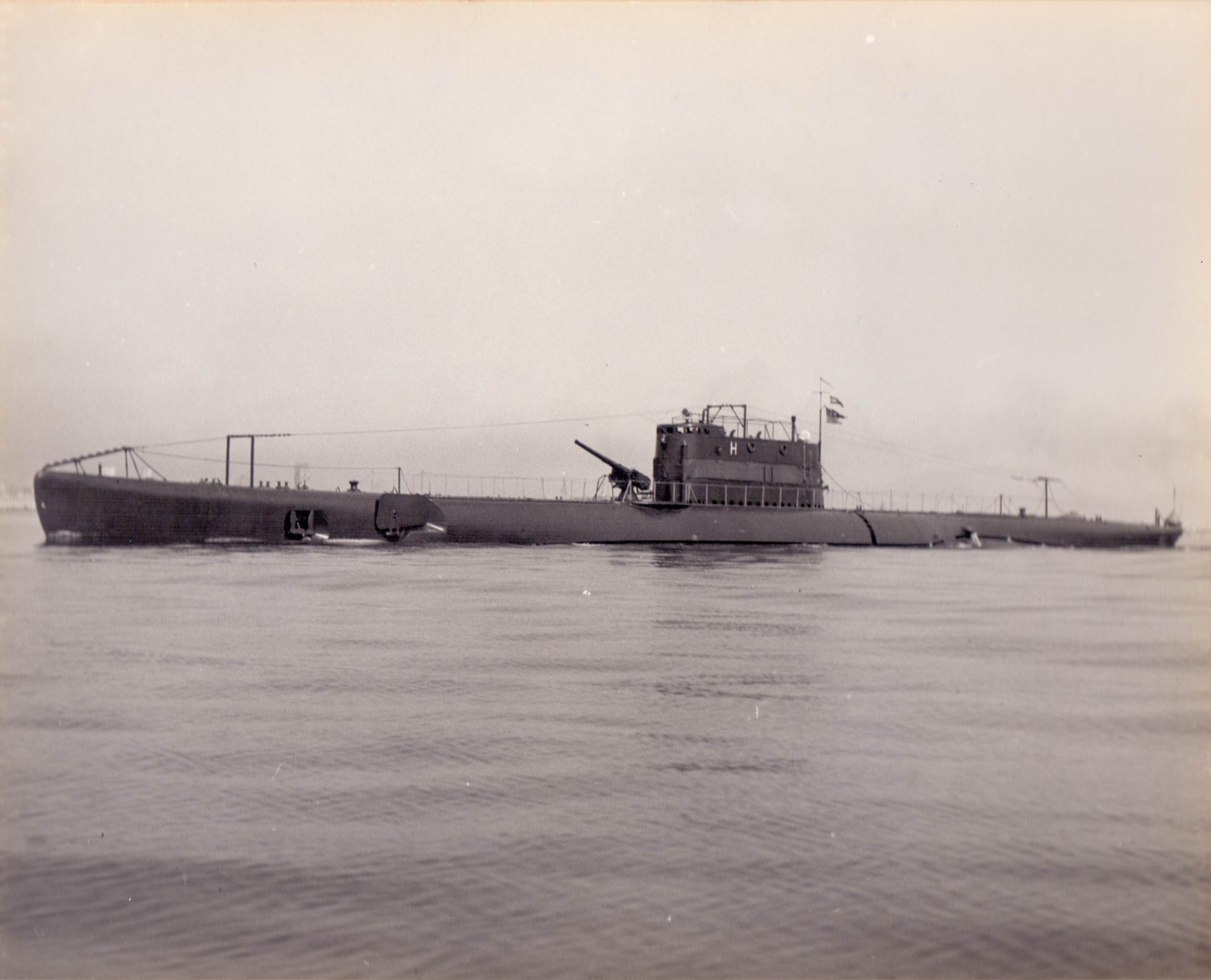

History

Brazil
- Name: Humaytá
- Namesake: Passage of Humaitá
- Laid down: 19 November 1925
- Launched: 11 June 1927
- Commissioned: 20 July 1929
- Decommissioned: 25 November 1950
- Fate: Scrapped

General characteristics
- Class & type: Modified Balilla-class submarine
- Displacement: 1,450 long tons (1,473 t) surfaced; 1,884 long tons (1,914 t) submerged
- Length: 86.7 m (284 ft)
- Beam: 7.77 m (25.5 ft)
- Draught: 4.26 m (14.0 ft)
- Propulsion: 2 × Ansaldo diesel engines, 4,000 shp (2,983 kW) surfaced; Electric motors, 1,000 shp (746 kW) submerged; 2 shafts
- Speed: 18.5 knots (34.3 km/h; 21.3 mph) surfaced; 10 knots (19 km/h; 12 mph) submerged
- Range: 12,840 nautical miles (23,780 km; 14,780 mi) at 10 knots (19 km/h; 12 mph) surfaced; 120 nmi (220 km; 140 mi) at 4 knots (7.4 km/h; 4.6 mph) submerged
- Test depth: 100 m (330 ft)
- Complement: 61
- Armament: 1 × 120 mm (4.7 in)/41 Ansaldo deck gun; 2 × 13.2 mm (0.52 in)/76 machine guns; 6 × 533 mm (21 in) torpedo tubes (4 bow, 2 stern); 12 × torpedoes; 16 × mines

Humaytá was a modified Balilla-class submarine built in Italy for the Brazilian Navy. The submarine was laid down by Odero-Terni-Orlando at La Spezia on 19 November 1925, launched on 11 June 1927, and handed over to the Brazilian Navy on 11 June 1929. Proceeds from the sale of the Marshal Deodoro to the Mexican Navy provided funds for Humaytá's purchase. Humaytá was commissioned into the Brazilian Navy on 20 July 1929. She remained in Brazilian service through World War II and was decommissioned on 25 November 1950.

== See also ==
- List of submarines of the Second World War
- List of historical ships of the Brazilian Navy

== Bibliography ==
- Scheina, Robert L. (1980). "Brazil". In Chesneau, Roger (ed.). Conway's All the World's Fighting Ships 1922–1946. Conway Maritime Press. pp. 416–418. ISBN 0-85177-146-7.
