= Pacinotti-class submarine =

Italian Navy submarines

Class overview
- Name: Pacinotti class
- Builders: FIAT-San Giorgio
- Operators: Regia Marina
- Completed: 2
- Lost: 1
- Retired: 1

General characteristics
- Type: Submarine
- Displacement: 710 t (700 long tons) (surfaced); 860 t (850 long tons) (submerged)
- Length: 65 m (213 ft 3 in)
- Beam: 6.05 m (19 ft 10 in)
- Draught: 4.12 m (13 ft 6 in)
- Propulsion: 2 × 2,000 hp (1,500 kW) FIAT diesel engines (surfaced); 2 × 900 kp Savigliano electric motors (submerged); 2 propellers
- Speed: 12 knots (22 km/h; 14 mph) (surfaced); 8.5 knots (15.7 km/h; 9.8 mph) (submerged)
- Range: 3,600 nmi (6,700 km; 4,100 mi) at 10 knots (19 km/h; 12 mph) (surfaced); 12 nmi (22 km; 14 mi) at 9 knots (17 km/h; 10 mph) (submerged)
- Complement: 39 (4 officers, 35 crew)
- Armament: 2 × Cannone da 76/30 Mod. 1914 R.M.; 5 × 450 mm (18 in) torpedo tubes (3 bow, 2 stern)

The Pacinotti class consisted of two submarines launched in 1916 for the Royal Italian Navy (Regia Marina): Pacinotti and Guglielmotti. Both submarines served in World War I. Gugliemotti was lost in a friendly fire incident with a British warship. Pacinotti spent the war defending Italian shipping around Italy. Following the war Pacinotti was discarded.

== Construction and career ==
The Regia Marina (the Royal Italian Navy) placed an order for the two submarines in 1913 from the Società FIAT-San Giorgio, Muggiano, La Spezia while SM U-42 (later renamed Balilla) was being built. The torpedo tubes in the bow were in the unusual number of three, an arrangement never adopted before or since.

The Pacinotti launched on 13 March 1916 and the Gugliemotti launched on 4 June 1916. The Gugliemotti, while on its maiden voyage, was mistaken for a German U-boat by HMS Cyclamen northwest of Capraia on 10 March 1917 where it was sunk by both gunfire and ramming. The Pacinotti operated in the Tyrrhenian Sea, defending trade routes, for a total of 13 missions between 24 March 1917 and 4 September 1917. It was then deployed to Sicily on 7 September 1917, undertaking anti-submarine patrols along with the 300 GRT Malamocco, which acted as bait for enemy submarines. The Pacinotti returned for maintenance at La Spezia on 20 December 1917, and was used for training from February 1919 to 4 June 1919 at La Maddalena. It was stricken from the list of active ships on 15 May 1921.
