= Italian submarine Balilla (1927) =

Balilla-class submarine

History

Italy
- Name: Balilla
- Builder: Odero-Terni-Orlando, Muggiano
- Laid down: 12 January 1925
- Launched: 2 February 1927
- Completed: 21 July 1928
- Decommissioned: 28 April 1941
- Fate: Scrapped,

General characteristics (as built)
- Class & type: Balilla-class submarine
- Displacement: 1,450 t (1,427 long tons) (surfaced); 1,904 t (1,874 long tons) (submerged)
- Length: 86.5 m (283 ft 10 in)
- Beam: 7.8 m (25 ft 7 in)
- Draft: 4.7 m (15 ft 5 in)
- Installed power: 4,900 bhp (3,700 kW) (diesels); 2,200 hp (1,600 kW) (electric motors)
- Propulsion: 2 shafts; diesel-electric; 2 × diesel engines; 2 × electric motors
- Speed: 17.5 knots (32.4 km/h; 20.1 mph) (surfaced); 8.9 knots (16.5 km/h; 10.2 mph) (submerged)
- Range: 12,000 nmi (22,000 km; 14,000 mi) at 7 knots (13 km/h; 8.1 mph) (surfaced); 110 nmi (200 km; 130 mi) at 3 knots (5.6 km/h; 3.5 mph) (submerged)
- Test depth: 110 m (350 ft)
- Complement: 77
- Armament: 1 × single 120 mm (4.7 in) deck gun; 2 × single 13.2 mm (0.52 in) machine guns; 6 × 533 mm (21 in) torpedo tubes (4 bow, 2 stern)

Balilla was the lead ship of her class of four submarines built for the Regia Marina (Royal Italian Navy) during the late 1920s.

== Design and description ==
The Balilla-class submarines were the first cruiser submarines built for the Regia Marina. They displaced 1,450 metric tons (1,427 long tons) surfaced and 1,904 metric tons (1,874 long tons) submerged. The submarines were 86.5 meters (283 ft 10 in) long, had a beam of 7.8 meters (25 ft 7 in) and a draft of 4.7 meters (15 ft 5 in). They had an operational diving depth of 110 meters (360 ft). Their crew numbered 77 officers and enlisted men.

For surface running, the boats were powered by two 2,450-brake-horsepower (1,827 kW) diesel engines, each driving one propeller shaft. When submerged each propeller was driven by a 1,100-horsepower (820 kW) electric motor. The submarines were also fitted with an auxiliary diesel cruising engine that gave them a speed of 7 knots (13 km/h; 8.1 mph) on the surface. They could reach a maximum speed of 17.5 knots (32.4 km/h; 20.1 mph) on the surface and 8 knots (15 km/h; 9.2 mph) underwater. On the surface, the Balilla class had a range of 12,000 nautical miles (22,000 km; 14,000 mi) at 7 knots; submerged, they had a range of 110 nmi (200 km; 130 mi) at 3 knots (5.6 km/h; 3.5 mph).

The boats were armed with six internal 53.3-centimeter (21 in) torpedo tubes, four in the bow and two in the stern, for which they carried a dozen torpedoes. They were also armed with a single 120-millimeter (4.7 in) deck gun, forward of the conning tower, for combat on the surface. Their anti-aircraft armament consisted of two 13.2-millimeter (0.52 in) machine guns.

== Construction and career ==
Ballila was laid down on 12 January 1925 at the Odero-Terni-Orlando shipyard in Muggiano, La Spezia. She was launched on 20 February 1927 and completed on 21 July 1928.

== See also ==
- Italian submarines of World War II

== Bibliography ==
- Bagnasco, Erminio (1977). Submarines of World War Two. Annapolis, Maryland: Naval Institute Press. ISBN 0-87021-962-6.
- Brescia, Maurizio (2012). Mussolini's Navy: A Reference Guide to the Regina Marina 1930–45. Annapolis, Maryland: Naval Institute Press. ISBN 978-1-59114-544-8.
- Chesneau, Roger, ed. (1980). Conway's All the World's Fighting Ships 1922–1946. Greenwich, UK: Conway Maritime Press. ISBN 0-85177-146-7.
- Fraccaroli, Aldo (1968). Italian Warships of World War II. Shepperton, UK: Ian Allan. ISBN 0-7110-0002-6.
- Rohwer, Jürgen (2005). Chronology of the War at Sea 1939–1945: The Naval History of World War Two (Third Revised ed.). Annapolis, Maryland: Naval Institute Press. ISBN 1-59114-119-2.
