= SM U-42 =

Pacinotti-class submarine of the Italian Navy

History

German Empire
- Name: U-42
- Builder: Società FIAT-San Giorgio, Muggiano, La Spezia
- Laid down: 18 August 1913
- Fate: Confiscated by Italian government on 8 August 1915

Kingdom of Italy
- Name: Balilla
- Acquired: 8 August 1915
- Fate: Sunk off Lissa on 14 July 1916

General characteristics
- Type: Submarine
- Displacement: 728 t (717 long tons) surfaced; 875 t (861 long tons) submerged
- Length: 65 m (213 ft 3 in)
- Beam: 6.05 m (19 ft 10 in)
- Draught: 4.17 m (13 ft 8 in)
- Propulsion: 2 shafts; 2 × FIAT 10-cylinder four stroke diesel motors with 2,600 PS (1,910 kW; 2,560 shp); 2 × Savigliano motordynamos with 900 PS (660 kW; 890 shp)
- Speed: 14 knots (26 km/h; 16 mph) surfaced; 9 knots (17 km/h; 10 mph) submerged
- Range: 3,500 nautical miles (6,500 km; 4,000 mi) at 10 knots (19 km/h; 12 mph) surfaced; 85 nautical miles (157 km; 98 mi) at 13 knots (24 km/h; 15 mph) submerged
- Test depth: 50 m (160 ft)
- Complement: 4 officers, 34 ratings
- Armament: 4 × 45 cm (18 in) torpedo tubes; 2 × 7.6 cm (3.0 in) deck guns

SM U-42 was a submarine ordered for construction by the Imperial German Navy. The vessel was designed by the naval engineer Cesare Laurenti, and laid down on 18 August 1913 in Italy at Società FIAT-San Giorgio, Muggiano, La Spezia. It served as the basis for the design of the Pacinotti-class submarines. The vessel was confiscated by the Italian government after entering World War I. The vessel was renamed Balilla and served with the Royal Italian Navy (Regia Marina) until sunk in a battle on 14 July 1916 with two torpedo boats.

== Construction and career ==
Ordered by the Imperial German Navy as the U-42, the submarine was confiscated by the Italian government on 8 August 1915 after entering war with Austria-Hungary during World War I. The submarine was then completed and Commissioned as Balilla by the Regia Marina. After completion of trials, the Balilla was added to the 4th Squadriglia at Brindisi in February 1916, where it was tasked with guarding the coast against enemy forces as well as short-range ambush missions against enemy vessels. On 14 July 1916 she was attacked by two Kaiman-class torpedo boats, the Hydra and Skorpion. After a lengthy surface battle, Balilla was sunk by gunfire with all hands lost.
