= USS Volador (SS-490) =

Submarine of the United States

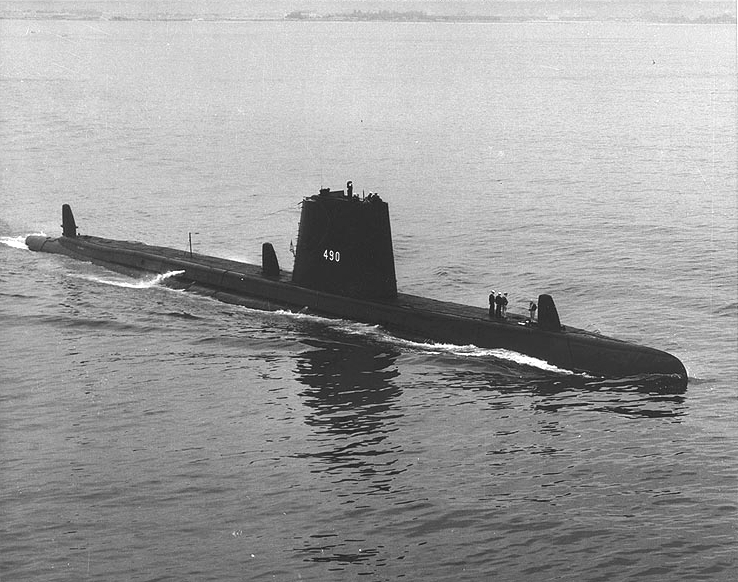
- USS Volador (the three distinctive shark-fin domes are the PUFFS sonar).

History

United States
- Name: USS Volador (SS-490)
- Builder: Portsmouth Naval Shipyard, Kittery, Maine
- Laid down: 15 June 1945
- Launched: 21 May 1948
- Commissioned: 1 October 1948
- Decommissioned: 18 August 1972
- Stricken: 5 December 1977
- Fate: Transferred to Italy, 18 August 1972; sold to Italy 5 December 1977

History

Italy
- Name: Gianfranco Gazzana Priaroggia (S 502)
- Acquired: 18 August 1972
- Stricken: 1981

General characteristics (Completed as GUPPY II)
- Class & type: Tench-class diesel-electric submarine
- Displacement: 1,870 tons (1,900 t) surfaced; 2,440 tons (2,480 t) submerged
- Length: 307 ft (94 m)
- Beam: 27 ft 4 in (8.33 m)
- Draft: 17 ft (5.2 m)
- Propulsion: 4 × Fairbanks-Morse Model 38D8-1/8 10-cylinder opposed piston diesel engines, equipped with a snorkel, driving electrical generators; 1 × 184 cell, 1 × 68 cell, and 2 × 126 cell GUPPY-type batteries (total 504 cells); 2 × low-speed direct-drive Elliott electric motors; two propellers
- Speed: Surfaced: 18.0 knots (33.3 km/h) maximum; 13.5 knots (25.0 km/h) cruising; Submerged: 16.0 knots (29.6 km/h) for 1/2 hour; 9.0 knots (16.7 km/h) snorkeling; 3.5 knots (6.5 km/h) cruising
- Range: 15,000 nm (28,000 km) surfaced at 11 knots (20 km/h)
- Endurance: 48 hours at 4 knots (7 km/h) submerged
- Test depth: 400 ft (120 m)
- Complement: 9–10 officers; 5 Chief Petty Officers; 70 enlisted men
- Sensors & processing systems: WFA active sonar; JT passive sonar; Mk 106 torpedo fire control system
- Armament: 10 × 21-inch (530 mm) torpedo tubes; (six forward, four aft)

General characteristics (Guppy III)
- Displacement: 1,975 tons (2,007 t) surfaced; 2,450 tons (2,489 t) submerged
- Length: 321 ft (98 m)
- Beam: 27 ft 4 in (8.33 m)
- Draft: 17 ft (5.2 m)
- Speed: Surfaced: 17.2 knots (31.9 km/h) maximum; 12.2 knots (22.6 km/h) cruising; Submerged: 14.5 knots (26.9 km/h) for 1/2 hour; 6.2 knots (11.5 km/h) snorkeling; 3.7 knots (6.9 km/h) cruising
- Range: 15,900 nm (29,400 km) surfaced at 8.5 knots (16 km/h)
- Endurance: 36 hours at 3 knots (6 km/h) submerged
- Complement: 8–10 officers; 5 petty officers; 70–80 enlisted men
- Sensors & processing systems: BQS-4 active search sonar; BQR-2B passive search sonar; BQG-4 passive attack sonar

USS Volador (SS-490), a Tench-class submarine, was the second ship of the United States Navy to be named for the volador.

== Construction and commissioning ==
The contract to build her was awarded to Portsmouth Naval Shipyard in Kittery, Maine, and her keel was laid down on 15 June 1945, but work on her construction was discontinued in January 1946. Her unfinished hulk remained on the ways until August 1947, when construction resumed, now including GUPPY II enhancements to the basic Tench-class design. Volador was launched on 21 May 1948, sponsored by Mrs. Harriet Rose Morton (née Nelson), widow of Commander Dudley W. Morton, and commissioned on 1 October 1948, with Lieutenant Commander Howard A. Thompson in command.

== Operational history ==
=== West Coast ===
Volador completed her builder's trials on 20 January 1949, left Portsmouth three days later, and stopped at Newport, Rhode Island, and New London, Connecticut, before sailing for the Gulf of Mexico on 5 February. Volador arrived at New Orleans, Louisiana, on 11 February and proceeded to the West Coast, via Galveston, Texas, and the Panama Canal, and arrived at San Diego, California, on 11 March. The submarine conducted local operations along the California coast between San Diego, California, and San Francisco, California, until she departed San Diego on 13 October, bound for Hawaii. She arrived at Pearl Harbor on 7 November but returned to San Diego on 18 November and spent the remainder of 1949 as well as most of the following year on the West Coast, conducting various training exercises. During that period, she also visited Portland, Oregon, Vancouver, Washington, and Pearl Harbor. In June 1950, Volador embarked reserves at Treasure Island, San Francisco, and proceeded on a two-week reserve cruise to Hawaii. En route, the Korean War broke out, and the submarine spent two months training in Hawaiian waters before returning to San Diego for operations on the West Coast that lasted into the summer of 1951.

=== Korean War ===
The submarine departed San Diego, California, on 21 July, bound, via Pearl Harbor, for Japan and arrived at Yokosuka on 15 August 1951. On 18 August, Volador got underway from Yokosuka for a period of special operations. Her orders directed the submarine to conduct an undetected reconnaissance patrol in the area of Hokkaidō, Japan, for a four-week period, in order to keep Commander, Naval Forces Far East, informed of any Soviet or People's Republic of China's seaborne and airborne activity in that area. Throughout her patrol, the submarine identified and photographed numerous radar contacts and made rendezvous with submarines Ronquil and Tiru to exchange patrol reports and other valuable information. On 16 September, Volador held ceremonies commemorating her 1000th dive. After a 24-hour engineering run in Tsugaru Strait, she ended her patrol and arrived in Yokosuka on 22 September. From 11 to 15 November, Volador conducted ASW operations with destroyers Hanson, George K. MacKenzie, and Taussig in the Atami area. From 16 November to 9 December, Volador participated in hunter/killer operations en route to Okinawa from Japan in company with Task Group (TG) 96.7. The submarine visited Buckner Bay, Okinawa, before heading home via Pearl Harbor.

Volador returned to San Diego, California, in January 1952 and conducted local operations until early summer. She then spent three months in the Juan de Fuca Strait and the Puget Sound area before entering the Mare Island Naval Shipyard in October. During the five-month overhaul which followed, a new battery and an Askania automatic depth control system were installed. Upon her return to San Diego, Volador provided services to ASW surface units, aircraft, and the Fleet Sonar School and participated in type training, Exercise "Pacphibex", and hunter/killer exercises. She departed San Diego on 7 August 1953 and arrived at Pearl Harbor on 15 August, received briefings by members of the Commander in Chief, Pacific Fleet, and the Commander, Submarines, Pacific staffs on 17 and 18 August and tested experimental sonar equipment at sea on 20 August.

=== Special operations ===
On 22 August 1953, Volador began a period of special operations, departing Pearl Harbor for an Alaskan training cruise which kept her in northern waters until October 1953. Her patrol station was northeast of the St. Lawrence Bay, and, on 1 September, she made rendezvous with submarine Blackfin off the southwest cape, St. Lawrence Island; the following day, she snorkeled to an area off Brook Bank, then proceeded to the Bering Strait area. Volador conducted a shipping reconnaissance patrol until the night of 27 September 1953 when she made rendezvous with and was relieved by submarine Caiman. Volador arrived at Pearl Harbor on 7 October 1953. During her second patrol, she contacted a total of 63 ships and identified and photographed the majority of them.

=== Western Pacific ===
Returning to San Diego, California, Volador rendered services and conducted type training there until May 1954, when she entered the Mare Island Naval Shipyard for overhaul. The yard work was completed in October 1954 and Volador returned to San Diego for local operations. Departing San Diego on 3 January 1955 for her second tour of duty in the Western Pacific (WestPac), Volador proceeded to Yokosuka, Japan, via Pearl Harbor. Upon arrival at Yokosuka on 26 January 1955, she conducted type training and furnished ASW services to a destroyer division and elements of the Japan Maritime Self-Defense Force until 1 March 1955. She then completed two weeks of routine upkeep on 13 March, prior to departure for another period of special operations on 14 March.

Volador transited Tsugaru Strait and, on 19 March commenced a submerged patrol on the lane between Vladivostok and La Perouse Strait which lasted until 8 April. She then commenced a transit of Tsugaru Strait and set a course back to Yokosuka where she moored on 11 April 1955. After the completion of this patrol, Volador was commended for excellent photography, correct identification of contacts, and accurate reporting of identifying characteristics regarding the 33 ships contacted.

=== West Coast ===
Visiting Subic Bay, Hong Kong, and Pearl Harbor while en route, Volador returned to San Diego, California, on 1 July. The submarine operated along the West Coast for the next two years. In August 1957, Volador commenced another Far East deployment. She arrived at Pearl Harbor on 3 August and departed three days later for a 30-day patrol off Petropavlovsk, Kamchatka. Her mission was to gather intelligence information. Due to motor casualties nine days after arrival on station, she departed the Petropavlovsk area on 25 August and arrived at Yokosuka five days later. During this patrol Volador contacted 13 merchant ships and eight warships.

On 8 November 1957, the submarine arrived at Subic Bay for a scheduled upkeep and departed on 17 November for Yokosuka. Volador arrived at Yokosuka on 26 November; and, from 11 December through 4 January 1958, she conducted a special reconnaissance patrol in the Sea of Okhotsk. During this 17-day undetected special patrol, she completed her photographic mission in spite of severe ice and blizzard conditions. Returning to Japan, Volador departed Yokosuka on 9 January for Pearl Harbor. She arrived at Hawaii on 19 January and departed two days later for San Diego, arriving on 28 January 1958.

Volador remained at San Diego until 3 October, when she departed for Vancouver, Washington. Twenty guests of the Vancouver Navy League were embarked at Longview, Washington, for a ship's visit and disembarked upon arrival at Vancouver. Volador was welcomed by a gathering of about 500 citizens, plus the local high school band, and was presented a plaque in a simple ceremony on board. She departed Vancouver on 5 October and visited Seattle, Washington, and Port Angeles, Washington, through the month of October. Volador visited Victoria, British Columbia, from 31 October through 3 November. Canadian frigate HMCS Antigonish was the host ship, and wardroom officers were entertained on board and in the homes of the host's officers.

The submarine patrolled the areas of Esquimalt, Washington, Port Angeles, Washington, Tacoma, Washington, and Seattle, Washington until 22 November when she began her return trip to San Diego, California, arriving on 26 November. Volador operated in the San Diego-San Francisco area until 5 May 1959 when she entered the San Francisco Naval Shipyard at Hunters Point for overhaul.

Completing overhaul in October 1959, the submarine returned to San Diego, California, for local operations until leaving for WestPac in late December. While thus deployed, Volador participated in many operations including amphibious Exercise "Blue Star" and SEATO Exercise "Sea Lion." Upon returning to San Diego, she participated in various local operations during the next 20 months.

In August 1960, "Volador" was assigned as a target submarine for the USS Kingfor the testing the new ASROC MK-44 torpedo system. While at periscope depth and being tracked by USS King's SQS-23B sonar, King fired an ASROC. The MK-44 torpedo separated from the rocket motor hit the Volador's sail after entering the water, leaving a hole in its sail.

=== Conversion ===
Volador spent the early months of 1962 in local operations in the San Diego area until she conducted a reserve cruise from 4 to 11 April. Upon her return, she was placed in commission, in reserve, while undergoing FRAM Mk 1 conversion to a GUPPY III configuration at the San Francisco Naval Shipyard. The submarine was saved from possible total destruction due to a spectacular pier fire at the shipyard on 9 and 10 November 1962 by the duty section led by the duty officer and the executive officer. In September 1962, Volador was returned to active service. The conversion was completed in February 1963. A 15-foot (5 m) hull section was installed in addition to a large amount of new electronic, fire control, and sonar equipment, making Volador one of the most modern diesel-electric submarines in the Fleet. After trials in Puget Sound, she returned to San Diego in April 1963 to take part in local operations.

=== Vietnam era ===
The submarine departed San Diego in September 1963 for another WestPac deployment. Near the conclusion of her tour, Volador conducted a special assignment which resulted in her receiving a commendation from the Commander, Submarine Force, United States Pacific Fleet, for "a mission of great value to the government of the United States." After returning to San Diego, she was assigned to local and Pacific coast operations.

In late 1964, Volador again distinguished herself by sending the submarine hulk ex-USS Sea Devil to the bottom after firing one homing torpedo in a weapons system evaluation test, making her the only submarine in the Navy to claim two peace-time "kills". Commander, Submarine Force, United States Pacific Fleet, awarded the "E" for overall performance "and for being adjudged the outstanding submarine in Submarine Squadron 5 in fleet intra-type competition for fiscal year 1965."

Volador resumed operations on 3 January 1966 after a short period of holiday routine in San Diego alongside the submarine tender Nereus. The greater part of January was spent conducting weapons system accuracy trials at the Dabob Bay and Carr Inlet facilities in the Puget Sound area. Volador returned to San Diego on 3 February and conducted a week of refresher training commencing on 10 February. Following this, she began a three-week upkeep period during which she successfully underwent an administrative inspection and a nuclear weapons acceptance inspection. On 7 March 1966, Volador left port for a week of type training in the local operating areas during which time sound trials were conducted to investigate the problem of noisy propellers. She got underway on 4 April for a four-day restricted availability at the San Francisco Bay Naval Shipyard where new propellers were installed. The remainder of April and the period until 11 May were spent in the San Diego area conducting various tests and preparing for deployment to WestPac.

The submarine departed San Diego on 12 May and, after a four-day stopover in Pearl Harbor, reported to Commander, Seventh Fleet, for operational control on 3 June and arrived at Yokosuka, Japan, on 6 June 1966.

Following an eight-day upkeep period for voyage repairs, Volador departed Yokosuka on 14 June to provide ASW services to ships and aircraft of the Japan Maritime Self-Defense Force. Throughout the summer, she continued to conduct exercises and provide services which were made more meaningful by the mutual exchange of officers. The submarine operated in the areas of Yokosuka and Iwakuni, Japan, and Buckner Bay, Okinawa.

Volador was in upkeep status at Yokosuka from 15 to 23 September. She got underway for Hong Kong on 26 September, after which she stopped at Kaohsiung and Midway Island and arrived at Pearl Harbor on 6 November. She departed two days later for San Diego. Volador arrived at her home port on 19 November and spent the remainder of 1966 in holiday leave and upkeep status. She was nominated for the Captain Edward F. Ney Memorial Award for the most outstanding general mess for 1966. On 1 July 1966, Volador was awarded the Squadron 5 award for fire control and weapons excellence.

Operations resumed on 15 January 1967 after a period of holiday routine alongside the Submarine Facility, Ballast Point, San Diego. The first half of 1967 was spent participating in various exercises, undergoing upkeep and repairs, and qualifying for a nuclear weapons technical proficiency inspection, a material inspection, and an operational readiness inspection.

Volador then departed San Diego on 24 July en route to Auckland, New Zealand. She made a two-day stop at Pago Pago, American Samoa, and arrived at Auckland on 15 August. The submarine participated in LONGEX 67, then departed for Subic Bay and arrived there on 10 September for five days of upkeep and voyage repairs. She participated in Exercise "Gillnet", visited Buckner Bay, Okinawa, and arrived at Yokosuka, Japan, on 26 September. The remainder of the year was spent conducting various operations out of Yokosuka.

=== USS Pueblo incident ===
On 1 January 1968, Volador was en route to Hong Kong for a port visit. She arrived back at Yokosuka, Japan, on 24 January to learn that her deployment was being indefinitely extended because of mobilization response to the capture of "environmental research ship" Pueblo by the North Koreans. Volador departed for sea on 31 January and returned 31 days later. The submarine left Japan and made a two-day stopover at Pearl Harbor before arriving in San Diego on 29 March. The period until 26 June was spent in post-deployment upkeep and local operations. On 27 June, Volador departed for a regular shipyard overhaul in the Mare Island Naval Shipyard at Vallejo, California at which time a Mk 48 fire control system was installed. Post-overhaul trials were conducted in the San Francisco, California, operating area on 20 and 22 December, and the submarine finished the year at the San Francisco Naval Shipyard, Hunters Point.

Throughout January and February 1969, Volador held sound and weapons trials in the Puget Sound area. The next two months were spent in upkeep and training before heading to the Pacific northwest for a quality assurance system test of the Mk 48 Astor torpedo. After the firings, while en route to home waters, a stop was made at Monterey, California, on 20 May and 21 May to provide familiarization cruises for students of the Naval Postgraduate School, local members of the Navy League, and city leaders. The trip was an outstanding success and received wide dissemination through the local press media.

The submarine returned to San Diego, California, and commenced an upkeep period and a final workup for deployment. Volador departed San Diego on 28 July 1969 for Yokosuka, Japan, via Pearl Harbor. During the Christmas holidays, Volador visited Bangkok, Thailand, enjoying the exotic sights and the Thai people and providing a week of services to the Royal Thai Navy. Leaving Bangkok on 26 December, the ship headed for Hong Kong and was en route as the year ended.

Volador left Hong Kong for two weeks of operations and liberty in Yokosuka, Japan, before returning to San Diego, California, on 12 February 1970. The next month was a period of upkeep and rest for the crew. On 17 January 1970 she was involved in a collision with the Japanese freighter MIYAHIME MARU at the entrance to Tokyo bay, with both suffering minor damage. The following three months were filled with numerous exercises and drills to retrain the crew and to prepare for interfleet transfer to the East Coast. Volador departed San Diego on 7 August for transit to the East Coast via the Panama Canal. She arrived at her new home port of Charleston, South Carolina, and spent the remainder of 1970 there.

=== Mediterranean Sea ===
During the first few months of 1971, Volador conducted exercises and drills and underwent upkeep in preparation for deployment to the Mediterranean Sea. On 19 April, she arrived at Rota, Spain, and commenced participation in Exercise "Dawn Patrol 71 in (1,800 mm) with several NATO units on 23 April. Upon completion of this exercise on 12 May, Volador visited Piraeus, Greece; Augusta Bay, Sicily; Palma de Mallorca, Mallorca; Villefranche-sur-Mer, France; Gibraltar; Naples, Italy; and Málaga, Spain; and returned to Rota on 19 July for turnover. Volador departed for Charleston, South Carolina, on 21 July after spending three months in the Mediterranean Sea. On 1 August, she was diverted from her homeward transit to render assistance to the tanker M/T Lacon, a Liberian vessel which was on fire. Volador arrived at Charleston on 5 August and began a period of leave and upkeep until 20 September when she entered the Charleston Naval Shipyard, commencing a regular overhaul and battery renewal.

== Gianfranco Gazzana Priaroggia (S 502) ==
On 18 August 1972, Volador was transferred to Italy. She was stricken from the Naval Vessel Register on 5 December 1977.

Volador and Pickerel were transferred and commissioned into the Italian Navy at the same time. Some civilian sources disagree as which of them became Primo Longobardo and which became Gianfranco Gazzana Priaroggia (S 502). The United States Department of the Navy's Naval Historical Center maintains that Pickerel became Primo Longobordo and Volador became Gianfranco Gazzana Priaroggia. Gianfranco Gazzana Priaroggia was stricken in 1981.
