= Italian submarine Primo Longobardo (S 524) =

Sauro-class submarine

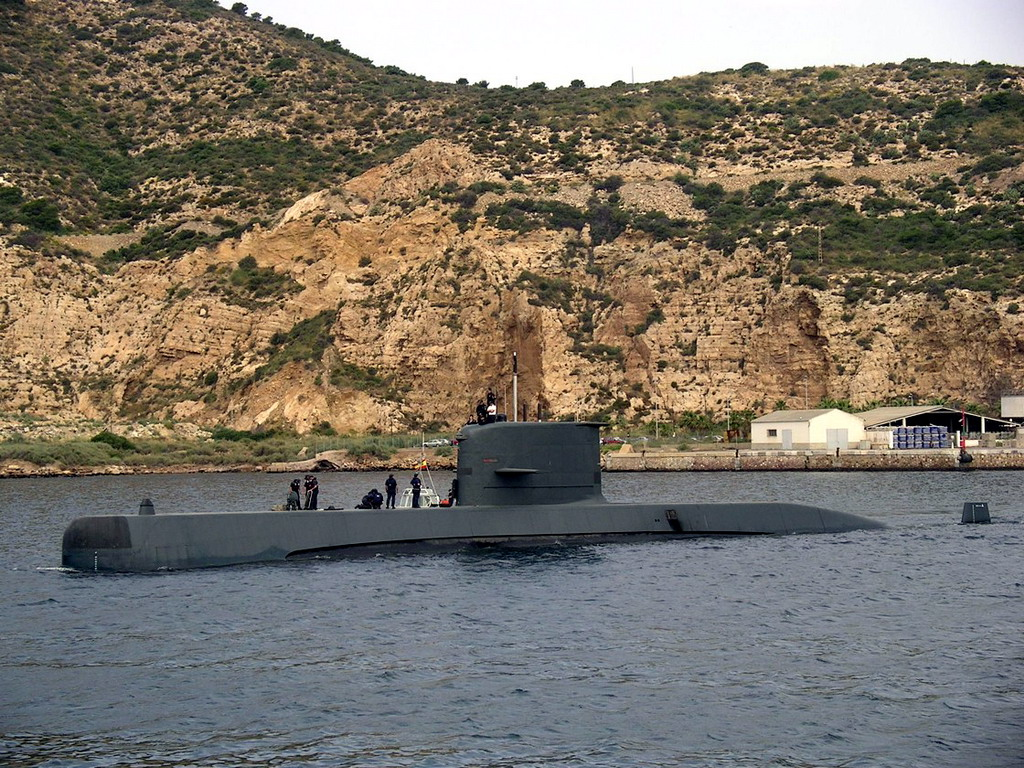
- Primo Longobardo

History

Italy
- Name: Primo Longobardo
- Namesake: Primo Longobardo
- Builder: Fincantieri, Monfalcone
- Laid down: 19 December 1991
- Launched: 20 June 1992
- Commissioned: 14 December 1993
- Home port: La Spezia
- Identification: Pennant number: S 524
- Status: Active

General characteristics
- Class & type: Sauro-class submarine
- Displacement: 1,653 tonnes (surfaced); 1,862 tonnes (submerged)
- Length: 66 m (216.5 ft)
- Beam: 6.83 m (22.4 ft)
- Draught: 6.3 m (20.7 ft)
- Depth: 300 m (984.3 ft)
- Propulsion: 3-shaft diesel Grandi Motori Trieste GMT 210.16-NM (2,7 mW); 1 electric engine ABB
- Speed: 12 knots (22 km/h; 14 mph) (surfaced); 19 knots (35 km/h; 22 mph) (submerged)
- Range: 2,500 nmi (4,600 km; 2,900 mi) at 12 knots (22 km/h; 14 mph)
- Complement: 7 officers; 44 enlisted
- Sensors & processing systems: 1 x radar SMA MM/BPS 704-V2; 1 x sonar STN Atlas Elektronik – ISUS 90-20; Combat System STN Atlas Elektronik – ISUS 90-20; periscopes Kollmorgen; communication system IRSC, by Hagenuk Marinekommunikation; Submarine Action Information System SMA/Datamat MM/SBN-716 SACTIS; periscopes Barr & Stroud CK31 Search and CH81 Attack Periscopes; communication system by ELMER
- Electronic warfare & decoys: ESM systems Elettronica Spa, BLD-727
- Armament: 6 × 533 mm (21 in) torpedo tubes with reloads for: 1.) Black Shark torpedo Mod.3; 2.) Naval mines

Primo Longobardo (S 524) is a Sauro-class submarine of the Italian Navy.

== Construction and career ==
Primo Longobardo was laid down at Fincantieri Monfalcone Shipyard on 19 December 1991 and launched on 20 June 1992. She was commissioned on 14 December 1993.

The boat, during its operational life, has carried out various activities at national and international level. Among the former there are both the classic institutional activities of the armed force such as surveillance in the enlarged Mediterranean in the context of the fight against maritime terrorism, and activities related to police tasks such as the repression of drug trafficking and the control of illegal immigration, and of protection environmental such as hydrocarbon pollution monitoring. Staff training is also carried out with participation in national exercises; with the naval air forces of the Naval Squad in the Open Sea, Amphex, Tirnav and Tiraer-Tireli cycles; in collaboration with the Underwater Operating Group in rescue training for submarines damaged in the Smerex cycles; with the Incursori Operational Group and the San Marco Regiment, now brigade, in training for Special Operations. International activities include NATO campaigns in the Mediterranean, Atlantic, Red Sea and Indian Ocean; in detail he participated in the operational cycles Dog Fish, Destined Glory, Loyal Midas, Noble Manta, Noble Mariner, Proud Manta, Dynamic Guard

Although initially equipped with 6 torpedo launchers for A-184 Mod.3 wire-guided torpedoes and capable of launching mines, during an update it was prepared for the use of anti-ship missiles. During 2011, in collaboration with the NATO Underwater Research Center (NURC), the boat experimented with the latest generation of acoustic and magnetic sensors and carried out numerous tests with AUVs equipped with bistatic sona

== Gallery ==
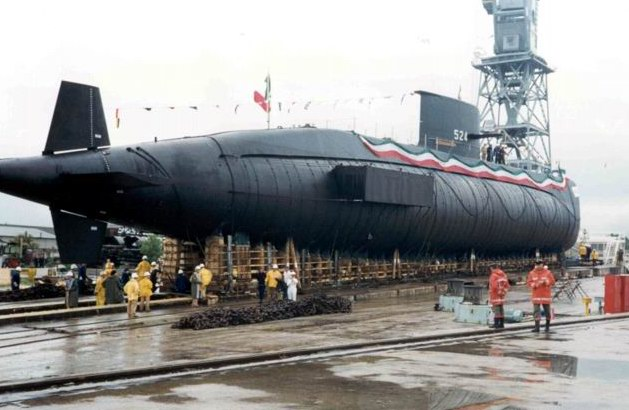
Primo Longobardo being launched on 20 June 1992
