= Niccolò Pacinotti =

Italian cyclist

Personal information
- Born: 5 February 1995 (age 31) Florence, Italy

Cycling career
- Sport: Cycling
- Discipline: Road
- Role: Rider

Amateur teams
- 2014–2015: Mastromarco Sensi Dover Benedetti
- 2016: Hopplà-Petroli Firenze

Professional team
- 2017: Bardiani–CSF

Niccolo Pacinotti (born 5 February 1995 in Florence) is an Italian cyclist, who last competed for UCI Professional Continental team Bardiani–CSF.

He won the Hopplà Petroli Firenze in 2017.

== Major results ==
2012
1st Trofeo Buffoni
