= Armando Morales Barillas =

Hector Armando Morales Barillas (January 1936 – July 23, 1984), better known as Armando Morales Barillas, was a Nicaraguan classical guitarist born in the town of Esquipulas in Nicaragua. His parents were Juan Morales Cerna and Tomasita Barillas Mairena.

== Early life ==
Armando attended elementary school in Esquipulas where his father introduced him to the guitar. He went to Evaristo Carazo primary school in the city of Matagalpa under the supervision of Eliseo Picado. He attended secondary school in Managua (Capital of Nicaragua) and went on to receive an Agricultural Engineering degree in 1955.

But his passion was the guitar and decided to give up his job as an agricultural technician to pursue a career as a solo guitarist in Costa Rica where he received advanced training from top South American guitarists.

== Career ==
Armando made several artistic performances all over Central, South and North America. He also traveled to Spain where he had the pleasure of sharing stage with Andrés Segovia. He also made several appearances all over Europe. Armando became most famous for being the first Nicaraguan guitarist to interpret melodies and regional music in classical style. His concerts in Teatro Nacional de Costa Rica and Teatro Nacional Rubén Darío in Nicaragua were popular and constantly sold out.

Armando's popularity led him to start his own radio show called "Una Guitarra de Noche" or "A Guitar of the Night." He also made appearances in National television shows everywhere he traveled.

One of Armando's most famous arrangement is that of "La Mora Limpia" which he arranged as a classical piece and is considered as a second national anthem in Nicaragua. In 1983, he wrote "Florecita de Mayo" which is a classical waltz he wrote for his daughter. Through his music and arrangements, Armando Morales Barillas brought Nicaraguan folk music to many homes of different parts of the world. He was a master in converting regional songs into classical guitar arrangements.

== Marriage and personal life ==
Armando Morales met Leoncia Mercedes Escoto in the mid-1970s. They were married in 1976 and had 5 children. He has two unknown daughters from two previous relationships the first one residing in El Salvador and the second residing somewhere in the United States. He was a music teacher of guitar and flamenco. He was also an anonymous engineer.

== Death ==
On July 23, 1984, Armando Morales died. With his sudden death Nicaragua had lost its foremost exponent of the classical guitar. In 2002, Matagalpa celebrated the 18th anniversary of his death.

A group of guitarists, created the Octeto Armando Morales Barillas, in his honor, in September 2005. They have performed in his honor several times in Nicaragua.

In September 2006, the 3rd annual "Festival de Mazurcas, Polkas y Jamaquellos" took place in Nicaragua and was dedicated in the honor of Armando Morales Barillas.

== Footnotes ==
(2)www.manfut.org/matagalpa/biografias.html
