= Italian submarine Galileo Ferraris =

Galileo Ferraris was the name of at least two ships of the Italian Navy and may refer to:

- Italian submarine Galileo Ferraris (1913), a Pullino-class submarine launched in 1913 and discarded in 1919.
- Italian submarine Galileo Ferraris (1934), an Archimede-class submarine launched in 1934 and lost in 1941.
