= Balilla-class submarine =

Submarine class of the Italian navy

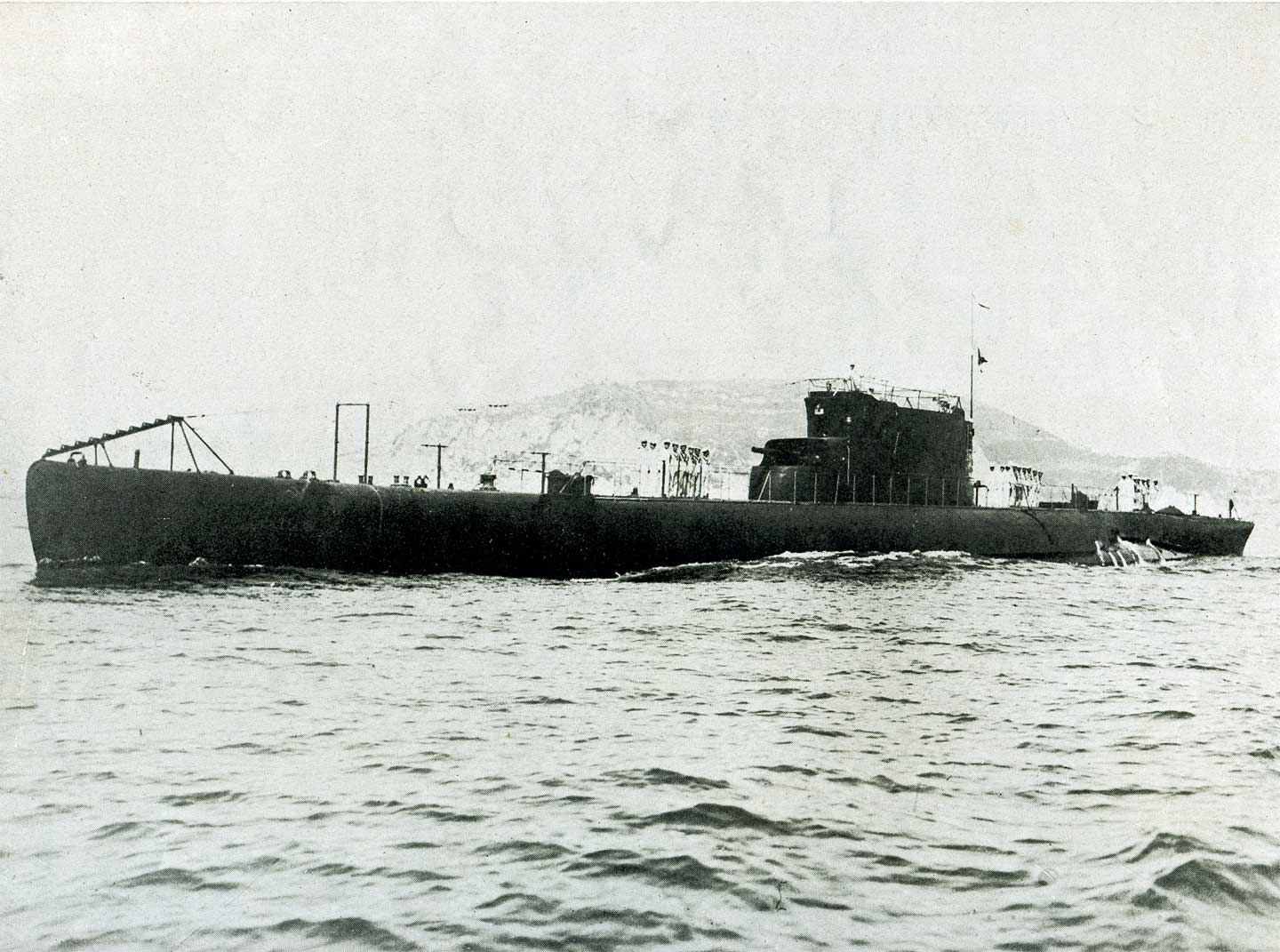
- Domenico Millelire

Class overview
- Name: Balilla class
- Builders: OTO
- Operators: Regia Marina; Brazilian Navy
- Succeeded by: Ettore Fieramosca
- Subclasses: Humaytá
- In commission: 1927–1950
- Completed: 5
- Lost: 1
- Scrapped: 4

General characteristics (as built)
- Type: Submarine
- Displacement: 1,450 t (1,427 long tons) (surfaced); 1,904 t (1,874 long tons) (submerged)
- Length: 86.5 m (283 ft 10 in)
- Beam: 7.8 m (25 ft 7 in)
- Draft: 4.7 m (15 ft 5 in)
- Installed power: 4,900 bhp (3,700 kW) (diesels); 2,200 hp (1,600 kW) (electric motors)
- Propulsion: 2 shafts; diesel-electric; 2 × diesel engines; 2 × electric motors
- Speed: 17.5 knots (32.4 km/h; 20.1 mph) (surfaced); 8.9 knots (16.5 km/h; 10.2 mph) (submerged)
- Range: 12,000 nmi (22,000 km; 14,000 mi) at 7 knots (13 km/h; 8.1 mph) (surfaced); 110 nmi (200 km; 130 mi) at 3 knots (5.6 km/h; 3.5 mph) (submerged)
- Test depth: 110 m (350 ft)
- Complement: 77
- Armament: 1 × single 120 mm (4.7 in) deck gun; 2 × single 13.2 mm (0.52 in) machine guns; 6 × 533 mm (21 in) torpedo tubes (4 bow, 2 stern)

The Balilla class were the first submarines to be built for the Italian navy following the end of World War I. They were large ocean-going cruiser submarines designed to operate in the Indian Ocean based in Italy's East African colonies. The design was double-hulled and based on the German Type UE II submarine U-boats, one of which, U-120 was supplied to the Italians as a war reparation. A 425 horsepower (317 kW) auxiliary diesel engine was installed as an extra generator.

During the war, the boats were stationed in the Mediterranean in 1940 but proved too large to be effective patrol submarines. Their only success was the sinking of the British submarine HMS Triad by Enrico Toti on 15 October 1940. After 1941 they were used as transport submarines to supply Italian forces in North Africa. The surviving boats were scrapped after the war.

One submarine, Humaytá, was built for the Brazilian Navy to a modified design.

== Design ==
The design of the Ballila class consisted of a strong double-hull which gave the ships a maximum diving depth of 110 m (350 ft), though Domenico Millelire reached 122 m (400 ft) in trials. The boats displaced 1,427 tons surfaced and 1874 tons submerged. They were 86.5 m (283 ft 10 in) long with a beam of 7.8 m (25 ft 7 in) and a draught of 4.7 m (15 ft 5 in). The boats were considered to have poor stability.

The submarines were powered by two Fiat diesels for surface cruising and two Savigliano electric motors for use while submerged driving two shafts. These created 4,900 bhp (3,700 kW) and 2,200 hp (1,600 kW) respectively. The second diesel engine was for auxiliary purposes and for recharging the batteries, novel at the time of the boats' construction. This gave the ships a speed of 16 knots (30 km/h; 18 mph) surfaced and 7 knots (13 km/h; 8.1 mph) submerged. However, the initial design called for the ability to reach speeds of 17.5 knots (32.4 km/h; 20.1 mph) surfaced and 8.9 knots (16.5 km/h; 10.2 mph) submerged; the subs never reached these marks. The Ballila-class boats had a range of 13,000 nmi (24,000 km; 15,000 mi) at 10 knots (19 km/h; 12 mph).

The Ballila class was armed with six 533 mm (21 in) torpedo tubes with four located in the bow and two in the stern. The submarines carried a load of 16 torpedoes, with two reloads for each bow tube and one reload for each stern tube.

The class was also armed with one 1924 model 120 mm (5 in)/27 calibre deck gun that was placed in a shielded mounting in the forward section of the conning tower. In 1934, the class underwent a refit that upgraded the model to a 120 mm (5 in)/45 calibre gun. The ships also received two 13.2 mm (0.52 in) machine guns placed two single mounts.

=== Humaytá sub-class ===
Humaytá was ordered by the Brazilian navy as a deep-diving submarine. Modifications to the standard Ballila design include the placement of the diesel and electric motors further forward, the elimination of the bow planes and a different distribution of the ballast tanks throughout the submarine. The submarine was longer at 87 m (285 ft 5 in) with a shallower draught, 4 m (13 ft). The vessel displaced 1,390 tons surfaced and 1,884 tons submerged.

The submarine was powered by two Ansaldo diesels with one electric motor creating 4,900 bhp (3,700 kW) and 900 hp (670 kW) respectively. This gave the ship a speed of 18.5 knots (34.3 km/h; 21.3 mph) surfaced and 9.5 knots (17.6 km/h; 10.9 mph) submerged.

Humaytá differed in armament too. The submarine was equipped with the six 533 mm (21 in) torpedo tubes with four located in the bow and two in the stern. However, the vessel had only a 4 in (102 mm) deck gun and carried 16 mines.

== Ships ==
All ships were built by OTO in Muggiano. Humaytá was a modified version of this design built for the Brazilian Navy in 1927. The ship was retired in 1950.

Ship details
Ship	Namesake	Country	Launched	Fate
Balilla	Giovan Battista Perasso	Italy	20 February 1927	Transformed in barge and broken up in 1946
Domenico Millelire	Domenico Millelire	Italy	19 September 1927	Turned into latex depot and used by Pirelli until 1977
Antonio Sciesa	Amatore Sciesa	Italy	12 August 1928	Damaged September 1942 at Benghazi, scuttled 12 November 1942
Enrico Toti	Enrico Toti	Italy	14 April 1928	Used as pontoon and broken up in 1946
Humaytá		Brazil	11 June 1927	Scrapped

== See also ==
- Italian submarines of World War II

== Bibliography ==
- Bagnasco, Erminio (1977). Submarines of World War Two. Annapolis, Maryland: Naval Institute Press. ISBN 0-87021-962-6.
- Brescia, Maurizio (2012). Mussolini's Navy: A Reference Guide to the Regina Marina 1930–45. Annapolis, Maryland: Naval Institute Press. ISBN 978-1-59114-544-8.
- Campbell, John (1985). Naval Weapons of World War Two. Annapolis, Maryland: Naval Institute Press. ISBN 0-87021-459-4.
- Chesneau, Roger, ed. (1980). Conway's All the World's Fighting Ships 1922–1946. London: Conway Maritime Press. ISBN 0-85177-146-7.
- Fraccaroli, Aldo (1968). Italian Warships of World War II. Shepperton, UK: Ian Allan. ISBN 0-7110-0002-6.
- Frank, Willard C. Jr. (1989). "Question 12/88". Warship International. XXVI (1): 95–97. ISSN 0043-0374.
