= Italian submarine Enrico Toti (S 506) =

Coordinates: 45.461692°N 9.171123°E

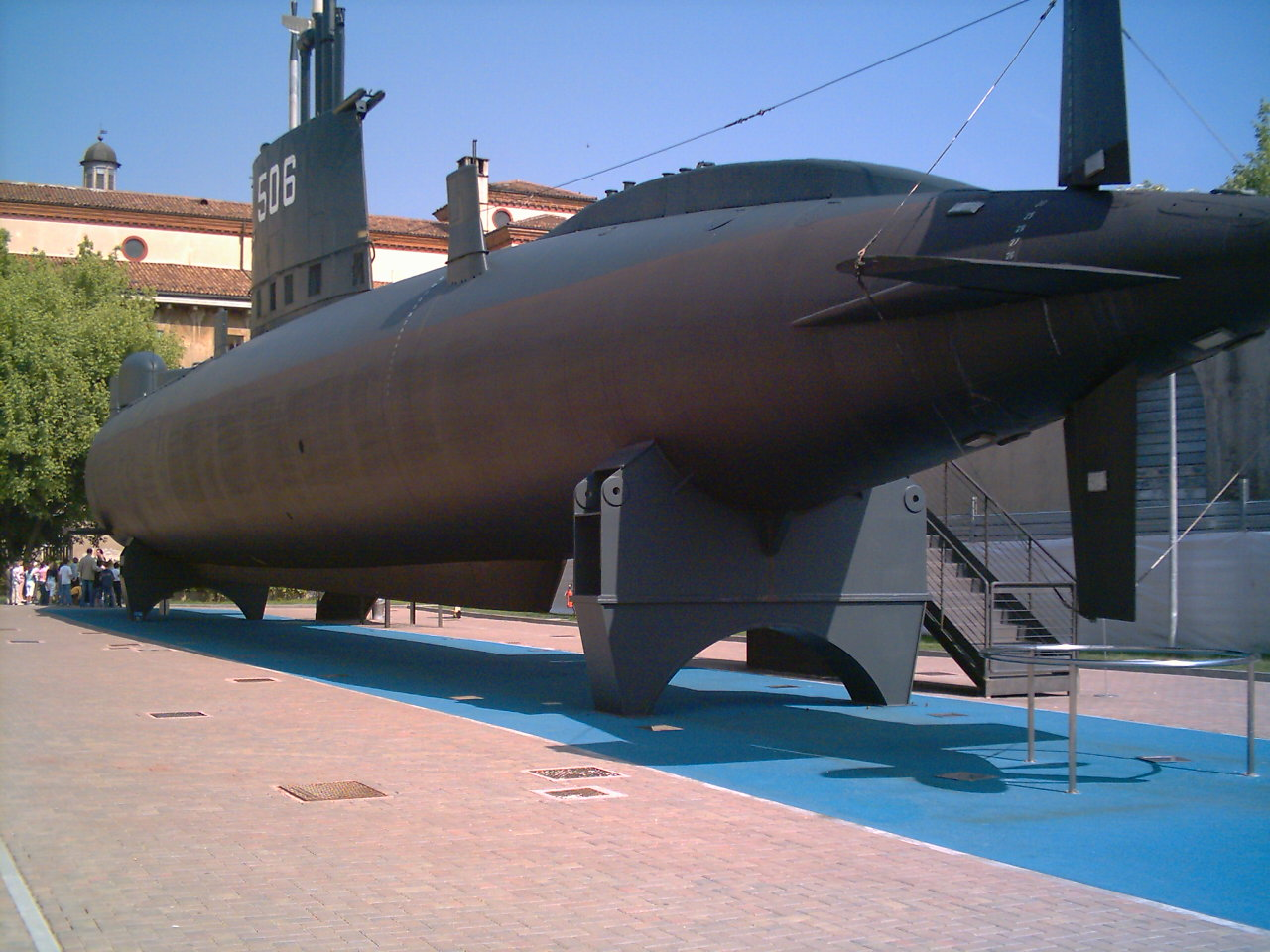

History

Italy
- Namesake: Enrico Toti
- Builder: Italcantieri Monfalcone
- Laid down: 15 April 1965
- Launched: 12 March 1967
- Commissioned: 22 January 1968
- Fate: Transported to Museo della Scienza e della Tecnologia "Leonardo da Vinci", in Milan.
- Status: Museum ship

General characteristics
- Class & type: Toti-class submarine
- Displacement: 532 t (524 long tons) surfaced; 591 t (582 long tons) submerged
- Length: 46.2 m (151.6 ft)
- Beam: 4.7 m (15.4 ft)
- Draught: 5.7 m (18.7 ft)
- Propulsion: 2 × Fiat MB 820 N/I Diesels, 1× electric motor; Diesel-electric drive; 1,600 kilowatts (2,200 hp)
- Speed: 14 kn (26 km/h; 16 mph) surfaced; 15 kn (28 km/h; 17 mph) submerged
- Range: 3,000 nmi (5,600 km; 3,500 mi) at 5 kn (9.3 km/h; 5.8 mph) (surfaced)
- Complement: 4 officers and 22 men
- Armament: 4 × 533 mm (21 inch) torpedo tubes

Italian submarine Enrico Toti (S 506) was the first of a new class of Italian submarine (Toti class), with Enrico Toti being laid down in 1965, launched in 1967, decommissioned in 1992 and preserved as a museum ship at the Museo della Scienza e della Tecnologia "Leonardo da Vinci", in Milan. The ship, and class, are named after the Italian war hero Enrico Toti.

== History ==
Toti was built by Fincantieri in Monfalcone, between 1965 and 1967, and given to the Italian Navy in 1968; Soon after that three more identical units were added to the Toti class. They are small submarines (so small that they were called "pocket sized submarines"), employed from the late 1960s until the end of the 1990s. They were conceived to work inside the Mediterranean Sea. They had two main tasks:

- patrol the Mediterranean sea with special attention to the Channel of Sicily during the Cold War; for this reason their main base was the Military Arsenal of Augusta (Syracuse);
- participate in NATO exercises with other submarines.

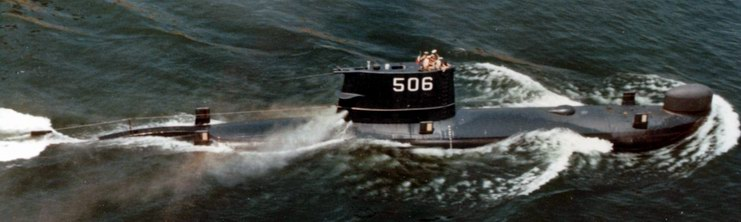
S506 Enrico Toti in action.

== Museum ship ==
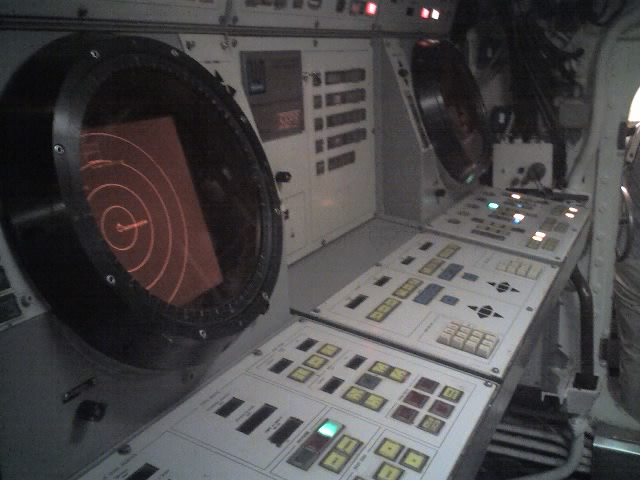
Control system for wire-guided torpedoes (the pictures on the screens are not genuine).

Enrico Toti arrived at the Museo della Scienza e della Tecnologia "Leonardo da Vinci" in August 2005 with a trip in two steps:

1. 2001: From Augusta to the Cremona port, towed through the Adriatic Sea and the Po (14 days)
2. 2005: From Cremona to Milan, on top of a specially built convoy, on a road trip lasting four nights.

As museum ship Enrico Toti is unusual, because Milan has no direct access to the sea or a significant river. Moreover, the museum is in the inner part of the city. The transportation of the sub to the museum was made overnight in mid-August, to minimize inconvenience to the population. Another Toti-class unit is on exhibition at the Arsenale in Venice, while the remaining two are scheduled for scrapping.

A stray female cat was found near the museum and personnel brought her in the Enrico Toti, where she lives and is called "the last captain of the Toti".

== Technical data ==
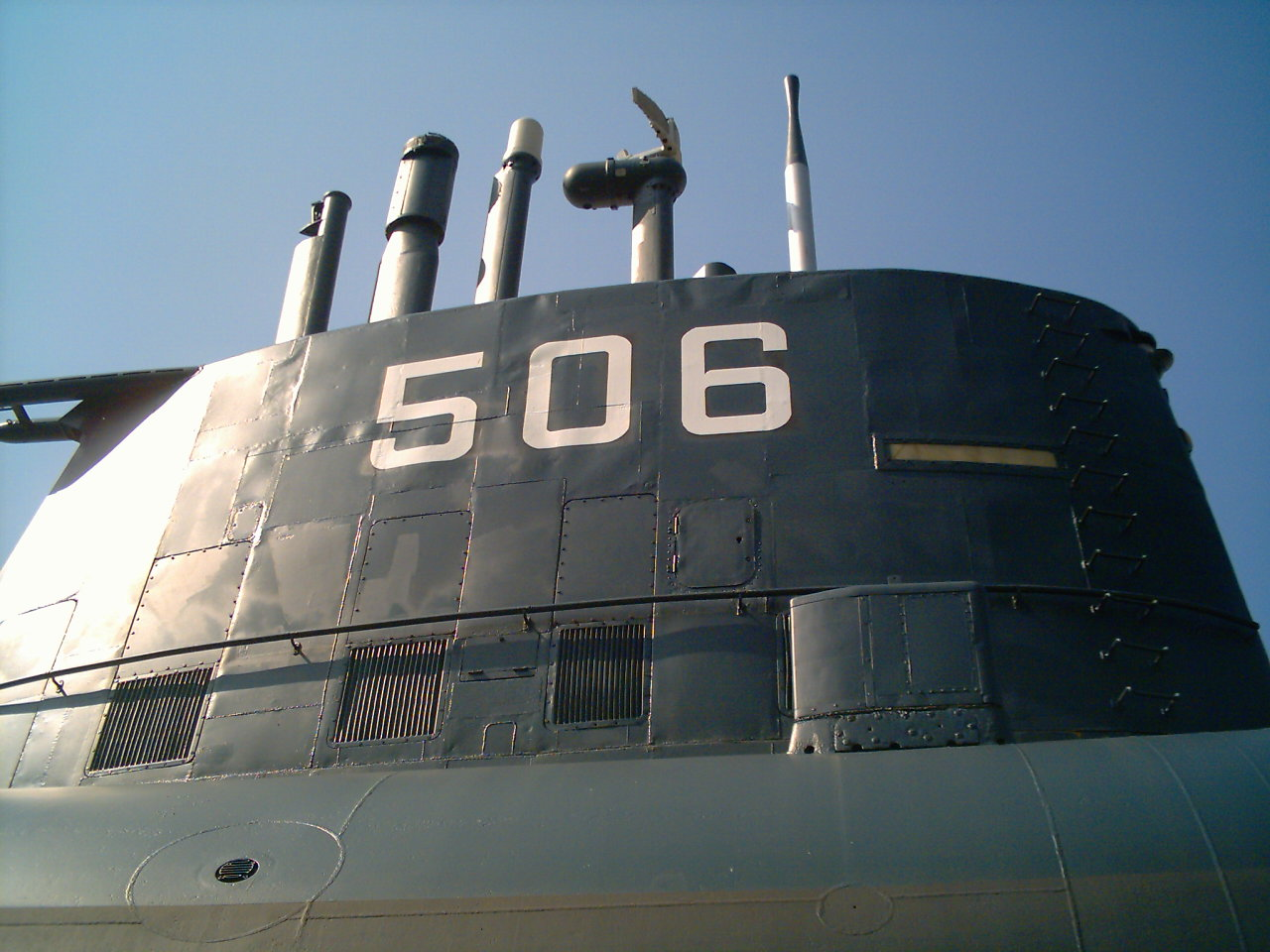
The number under the periscope.

- Length: 46 m
- Width: 4,75 m
- Speed: 9.5 knots in surface, 14 knots underwater
- Operational depth: 150 m
- Test depth: 300m
- Displacement: 530 tons in surface, 590 tons underwater
- Engines: 1 electrical propeller engine (900 hp); two Fiat diesel engines (1040 hp) generating electrical power.
- Armament: 4 launcher tubes for 533-mm torpedoes; wire-guided electrical torpedoes with auto-guided warhead.

== See also ==
- Media related to Enrico Toti (S 506) at Wikimedia Commons
- Moore, John (1979). Jane's Fighting Ships 1979–80. London: Jane's Yearbooks. ISBN 0-354-00587-1.
