= Badilla =

Badilla may refer to:

== People ==
- Gabriel Badilla (1984–2016), Costa Rican footballer
- Leoncio Badilla Evasco Jr. (born 1944), Filipino politician
- Rodrigo Badilla (born 1957), Costa Rican football referee
- Sergio Badilla Castillo (born 1947), Chilean poet

== Places ==
- Badilla, Queensland, a neighbourhood in Home Hill, Australia
- Badilla, Spain, see List of municipalities in Zamora
