= Toti-class submarine =

Vessels of the Italian navy

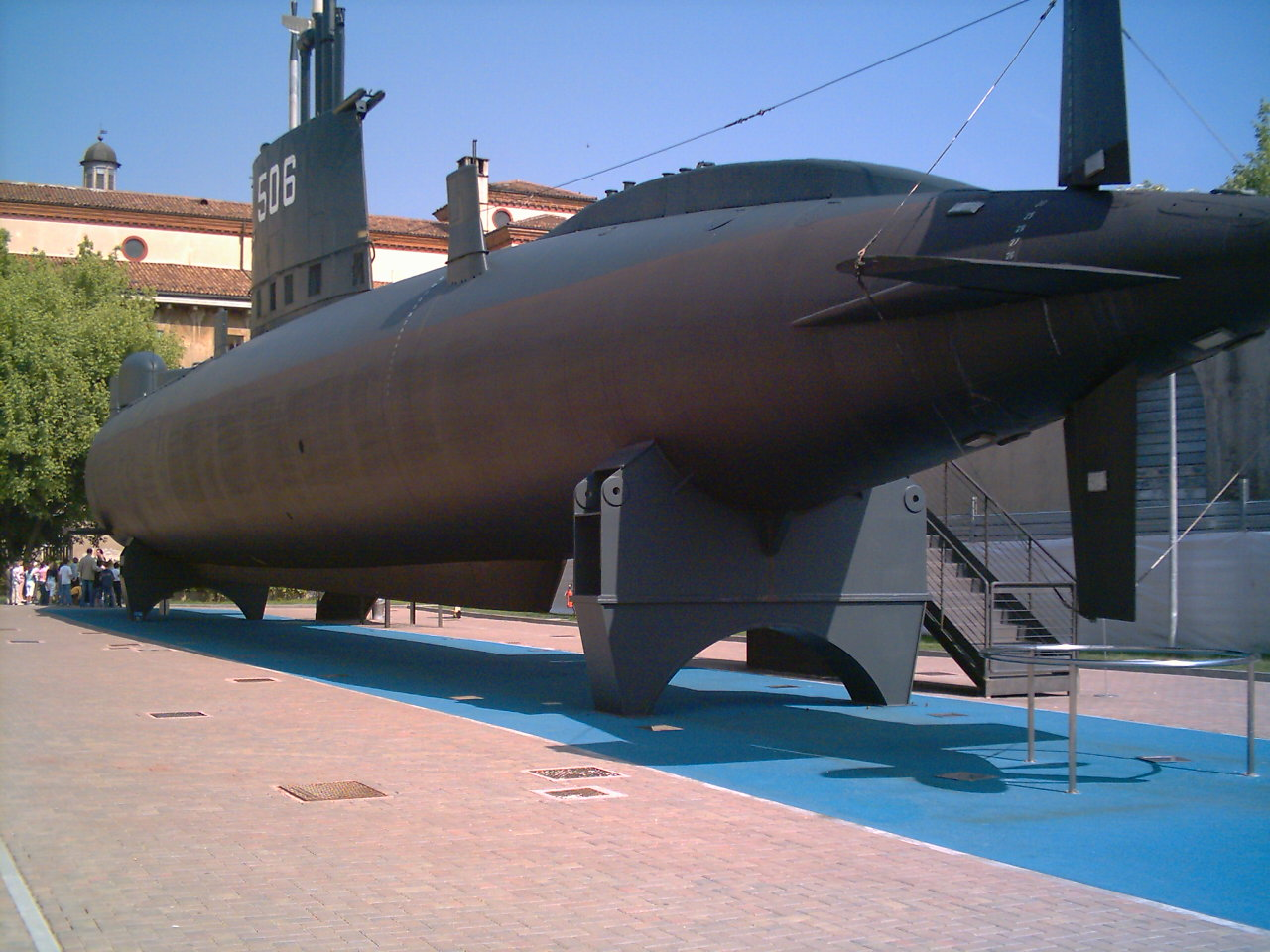
- The submarine Enrico Toti at the Milan Museum of Technology

Class overview
- Name: Toti class
- Builders: Italcantieri; Monfalcone shipyard
- Operators: Italian Navy
- Preceded by: Gato class / Balao class
- Succeeded by: Sauro class
- In service: 1968
- In commission: 1965–1993
- Completed: 4
- Retired: 4
- Preserved: 2

General characteristics
- Type: Submarine
- Displacement: 535 tons surfaced; 591 tons submerged
- Length: 46.2 m (151 ft 7 in)
- Beam: 4.75 m (15 ft 7 in)
- Draught: 4.0 m (13 ft 1 in)
- Propulsion: 1 shaft, 2 Fiat MB 820 diesel engines, 2,200 hp (1,600 kW), plus 1 electric motor
- Speed: 9.7 knots (18.0 km/h; 11.2 mph) surfaced; 14 knots (26 km/h; 16 mph) submerged
- Range: 3,000 nmi (5,600 km; 3,500 mi) at 5 knots (9.3 km/h; 5.8 mph)
- Test depth: 150 m (490 ft)
- Complement: 4 officers, 22 enlisted
- Sensors & processing systems: 1 × 3 RM-20 radar; 1 x JP-64 active sonar; 1 x Velox passive sonar
- Armament: 4 x 533 mm (21 in) torpedo tubes with 6 torpedoes

The Toti class were submarines built for the Italian Navy in the 1960s. They were the first submarines designed and built in Italy since World War II. These boats were small and designed as "hunter killer" anti-submarine submarines. They are comparable to the German Type 205 submarines and the French Aréthuse-class submarines.

== Ships ==
All four ships were built by Italcantieri (Fincantieri) to Monfalcone (Gorizia) shipyard.

Italian Navy – Toti class
Pennant number	Name	Hull number	Laid down	Launched	Commissioned	Decommissioned	Image	Notes
S 505	Attilio Bagnolini	1886	11 April 1965	26 August 1967	16 June 1968	5 July 1991		Scrapped in Aliaga Turkey 2021
S 506	Enrico Toti	1870	11 April 1965	12 March 1967	22 January 1968	30 September 1997		Museum ship in Milan
S 513	Enrico Dandolo	1887	10 March 1967	16 December 1967	29 September 1968	30 September 1996		Museum ship in Venice
S 514	Lazzaro Mocenigo	1888	12 June 1967	20 April 1968	28 December 1968	15 October 1993		Scrapped in Aliaga Turkey 2024

== See also ==
Equivalent submarines of the same era

- Natsushio class
- Hajen class
- Type 205
- Aréthuse class
