= USS Pickerel (SS-524) =

Submarine of the United States

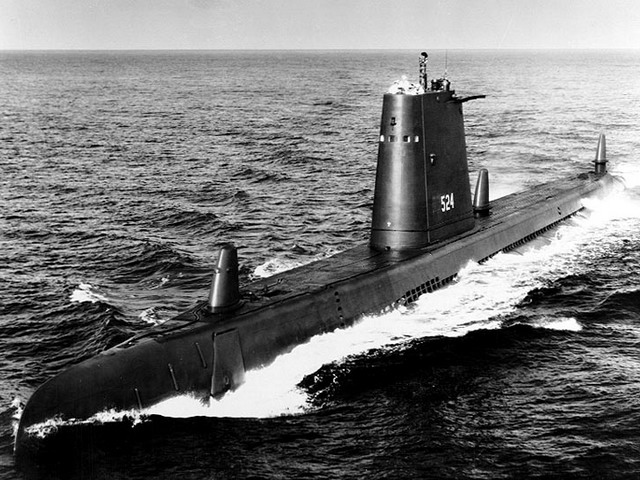
- USS Pickerel. The three distinctive shark-fin domes are the PUFFS sonar.

History

United States
- Name: USS Pickerel (SS-524)
- Builder: Portsmouth Naval Shipyard, Kittery, Maine
- Laid down: 8 February 1944
- Launched: 15 December 1944
- Commissioned: 4 April 1949
- Decommissioned: 18 August 1972
- Stricken: 5 December 1977
- Fate: Transferred to Italy, 18 August 1972

History

Italy
- Name: Primo Longobardo (S 501)
- Acquired: 18 August 1972
- Stricken: Either 31 January 1980 or 31 May 1981

General characteristics (Completed as GUPPY II)
- Class & type: Tench-class diesel-electric submarine
- Displacement: 1,870 tons (1,900 t) surfaced; 2,440 tons (2,480 t) submerged
- Length: 322.2 ft (98.2 m)
- Beam: 27 ft 4 in (8.33 m)
- Draft: 17 ft (5.2 m)
- Propulsion: 4 × Fairbanks-Morse Model 38D8-1/8 10-cylinder opposed piston diesel engines, equipped with a snorkel, driving electrical generators; 1 × 184 cell, 1 × 68 cell, and 2 × 126 cell GUPPY-type batteries (total 504 cells); 2 × low-speed direct-drive Westinghouse electric motors; two propellers
- Speed: Surfaced: 18.0 knots (33.3 km/h) maximum; 13.5 knots (25.0 km/h) cruising; Submerged: 16.0 knots (29.6 km/h) for 1/2 hour; 9.0 knots (16.7 km/h) snorkeling; 3.5 knots (6.5 km/h) cruising
- Range: 15,000 nm (28,000 km) surfaced at 11 knots (20 km/h)
- Endurance: 48 hours at 4 knots (7 km/h) submerged
- Test depth: 400 ft (120 m)
- Complement: 9–10 officers; 5 petty officers; 70 enlisted men
- Sensors & processing systems: WFA active sonar; JT passive sonar; Mk 106 torpedo fire control system
- Armament: 10 × 21 inches (530 mm) torpedo tubes; (six forward, four aft)

General characteristics (Guppy III)
- Displacement: 1,975 tons (2,007 t) surfaced; 2,450 tons (2,489 t) submerged
- Length: 321 ft (98 m)
- Beam: 27 ft 4 in (8.33 m)
- Draft: 17 ft (5.2 m)
- Speed: Surfaced: 17.2 knots (31.9 km/h) maximum; 12.2 knots (22.6 km/h) cruising; Submerged: 14.5 knots (26.9 km/h) for 1/2 hour; 6.2 knots (11.5 km/h) snorkeling; 3.7 knots (6.9 km/h) cruising
- Range: 15,900 nm (29,400 km) surfaced at 8.5 knots (16 km/h)
- Endurance: 36 hours at 3 knots (6 km/h) submerged
- Complement: 8–10 officers; 5 Chief petty officers; 70-80 enlisted men
- Sensors & processing systems: BQS-4 active search sonar; BQR-2B passive search sonar; BQG-4 passive attack sonar

USS Pickerel (SS-524), a Tench-class submarine, was the second ship of the United States Navy to be named for a young or small pike.

== Construction and commissioning ==
The contract to build Pickerel was awarded to the Boston Navy Yard in Boston, Massachusetts, and her keel was laid down on 8 February 1944. She was launched without a christening ceremony on 15 December 1944. After being towed to the Portsmouth Naval Shipyard in Kittery, Maine, for completion, she was simultaneously christened and commissioned on 4 April 1949, sponsored by Mrs. John R. Moore and commanded by Lieutenant Commander Paul R. Schratz.

== Early service ==
After sea trials, Pickerel departed New London, Connecticut, on 10 August, and headed for Hawaii via East and Gulf coast ports, and the Panama Canal and arrived Pearl Harbor on 28 September where she joined SubDiv 11.

From 16 March to 5 April 1950, Pickerel completed a 5,200-mile (8,370 km) voyage from Hong Kong to Pearl Harbor in 21 days while completely submerged, probably the longest distance ever traveled by a submerged diesel-electric submarine. During her first deployment in the Western Pacific in 1950, Pickerel spent four months in the Korean War zone, one of the first submarines to enter the Korean War. Much of Pickerel's early years are documented in Paul R. Schratz memoirs Submarine Commander: A Story of World War II and Korea, where Paul as Pickerel's commissioning captain walks the readers through putting a new modernized GUPPY Tench-class Fleet submarine through its paces.

Returning to Pearl Harbor in the spring of 1951, Pickerel operated in the Hawaiian area undergoing tests of maximum capabilities, and conducting intensive training until she returned to the Far East in July 1953.

Upon returning to Hawaii early in 1954, Pickerel resumed service for our aircraft and surface anti-submarine forces there and, but for overhaul, continued this important duty until returning to the Western Pacific in June 1955. She returned to Hawaii 1 December.

== 1960s ==
Pickerel alternated North Pacific with WestPac duty through 1963 with the exception of a conversion period during 1962 for GUPPY III modernization.

Pickerel operated out of Pearl Harbor during 1964 until 28 December, when she departed en route Yokosuka to begin a WestPac tour as a unit of the Seventh Fleet. In the years that followed, she continued this pattern of alternating services in Hawaii with deployments in the Far East. In the fall of 1966, her duties in WestPac were broadened to include operations in the Vietnam combat zone on Yankee Station.

After a year in Hawaiian waters, Pickerel headed west once more on 16 January 1968. She visited various ports of the Orient before returning to Yankee Station on 8 May. Following service in the combat zone, she reached Pearl Harbor via Japan on 8 July. Her home port was changed to San Diego, California on 1 August and she headed for the West Coast and Naval Shipyard, Hunters Point, on 22 August.

After completing overhaul in the Spring of 1969, Pickerel spent several weeks in the Puget Sound, Washington, area undergoing weapons and sound trials. She headed for Pearl Harbor in late April/early May 1969(?). Pickerel was transferred to SUBLANT/SUBRON 4 and arrived in her new home port of Charleston, South Carolina, on 9 June 1969.

== 1970s and after ==
Pickerel circumnavigated South America as part of operation UNITAS XI with USS Harry E. Yarnell, USS Charles P. Cecil (DD-835), USS Myles C. Fox (DD-829) and USS John Willis (DE-1027), as part of a goodwill tour and ASW (Anti-Submarine Warfare) training exercise for the U.S. Navy ships and the Navies of Venezuela, Brazil, Argentina, Chile and Peru. Pickerel transited the Strait of Magellan and Panama Canal as part of that deployment. The deployment started 23 August 1970 and was complete 4 December 1970.

Pickerel was transferred to Italy on 18 August 1972 and stricken from the Naval Vessel Register on 5 December 1977.

== Primo Longobardo (S 501) ==
Pickerel and Volador (SS-490) were transferred and commissioned into the Italian Navy at the same time. Some civilian sources disagree as which of them became Primo Longobardo and which became Gianfranco Gazzana Priaroggia. The United States Department of the Navy's Naval Historical Center maintains that Pickerel became Primo Longobardo (S 501) and Volador became Gianfranco Gazzana Priaroggia. Primo Longobardo was stricken on either 31 January 1980 or 31 May 1981.
