= Domenico Millelire =

Royal Sardinian Navy officer (1761–1827)

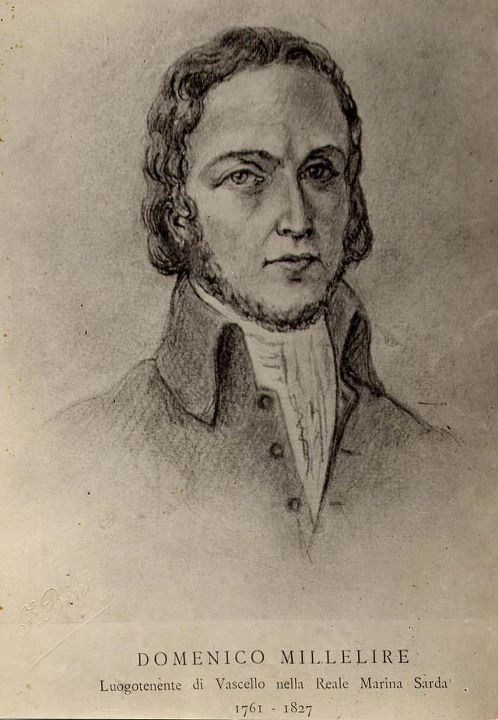
- An illustration of Millelire
- Born: 1761; La Maddalena
- Died: 1827 (aged 65–66); La Maddalena
- Military career
- Allegiance: Kingdom of Sardinia
- Branch: Royal Sardinian Navy
- Rank: Ship-of-the-line lieutenant
- Conflicts: French Revolutionary Wars; War of the First Coalition; French expedition to Sardinia
- Awards: Gold Medal of Military Valor

Ship-of-the-line Lieutenant Domenico Millelire (1761 – 1827) was a Royal Sardinian Navy officer who was the first man to be awarded the Gold Medal of Military Valor. Millelire was born in La Maddalena in 1761. He was the son of Pietro Leoni Millelire and Maria Ornano, who also had three other sons. Millelire, alongside his brothers, joined the Royal Sardinian Navy and rose to the rank of quartermaster.

On the night of 22 February 1793, during the French expedition to Sardinia, he bombarded a French flotilla of 16 troopships and the corvette La Fauvette under the command of Pietro Paolo Colonna-Cesari. Millelire had transported artillery to La Maddalena throughout the day, and his bombardment heavily damaged the flotilla. On 25 February, Millelire, commanding a small gunboat, attacked two French feluccas, causing panic amongst nearby French forces and resulting in La Fauvette fleeing towards the open sea.

He proceeded to disembark Sardinian troops on the southern side of the island of Santo Stefano, who recaptured it from the French and took several prisoners of war. Millelire was awarded the first Gold Medal of Military Valor and a lifetime annuity of 300 lire by Victor Amadeus III. He was subsequently promoted to ship-of-the-line lieutenant and died in La Maddalena in 1827.

== Bibliography ==
- Domenico Millelire e la difesa della Sardegna nel febbraio 1793 - 11 di Collana dei quaderni azzurri - Giorgio Bardanzellu - 1954
