= HMS Triad (N53) =

Submarine of the Royal Navy

Coordinates: 38°16′0″N 17°37′0″E

- HMS Triad

History

United Kingdom
- Name: HMS Triad
- Builder: Vickers-Armstrongs, Barrow
- Laid down: 24 March 1938
- Launched: 5 May 1939
- Commissioned: 16 September 1939
- Identification: Pennant number N53
- Fate: Sunk, 15 October 1940
- Badge

General characteristics
- Class & type: T-class submarine
- Displacement: 1,090 long tons (1,110 t) surfaced; 1,575 long tons (1,600 t) submerged
- Length: 275 ft (84 m)
- Beam: 26 ft 6 in (8.08 m)
- Draught: 16.3 ft (5.0 m)
- Propulsion: Two shafts; Twin diesel engines 2,500 hp (1.9 MW) each; Twin electric motors 1,450 hp (1.08 MW) each
- Speed: 15.25 knots (28.24 km/h) surfaced; 9 knots (17 km/h) submerged
- Range: 4,500 nautical miles (8,300 km) at 11 knots (20 km/h) surfaced
- Test depth: 300 ft (91 m) max
- Complement: 59
- Armament: 6 internal forward-facing 21-inch (533 mm) torpedo tubes; 4 external forward-facing torpedo tubes; 6 reload torpedoes; 1 x 4-inch (102 mm) deck gun

HMS Triad was a T-class submarine of the Royal Navy. She was laid down by Vickers-Armstrongs, Barrow and launched in May 1939.

== Career ==
Triad had a relatively short career, serving in the North Sea and the Mediterranean. In April 1940 during her patrol on the North Sea, she sank the German troop transport Ionia and attacked, but failed to sink the German depot ship Tsingtau.

== Mediterranean deployment and loss ==
Shortly after, Triad was assigned to the Mediterranean. On 9 October 1940 she sailed from Malta to operate in the Gulf of Taranto, with orders to reach Alexandria on completion of her patrol. She failed to make port and by 20 October the submarine was declared overdue. She was believed to have been lost in a minefield or sunk by Italian anti-submarine aircraft. New evidence suggests that Triad was engaged and sunk with all hands on the night of 14/15 October by the Enrico Toti.

For years, it was assumed that Enrico Toti had engaged and sunk HMS Rainbow, which was thought to be operating in the same area.

At the time of her sinking, Triad was commanded by Lt.Cdr. G.S. Salt, father of future Royal Naval Admiral Sam Salt.

=== Last action ===
At 01:00 on 15 October 1940, Enrico Toti sighted a large submarine 1,000 metres (3,300 ft) to port: both boats manoeuvred into attack position. Italian accounts claim the British opened fire first, but all of Triad's shells missed. She also fired a torpedo which Enrico Toti avoided by turning sharply, then closed on the enemy submarine at top speed, firing as she approached. Soon, machine gun fire compelled the British gunners to abandon the exposed deck. As the British submarine started to dive, Enrico Toti fired a torpedo and hit the British submarine with two 120 mm shells, with the gunfire attributed as the source of the sinking. The boat rose vertically then disappeared without survivors in waters south-west of Calabria. The action lasted around 30 minutes.

Famous Italian writer Dino Buzzati, then a very young navy war correspondent gave a lively account of the Triad vs Enrico Toti engagement. Though he was not directly on board the Italian submarine (he would later embark on an Italian cruiser and give a first hand account of the Battle of Cape Matapan), Buzzati interviewed officers and sailors of Enrico Toti on its return to base and published the story in October 1940. According to sailors' testimonies, the commanding officer of Enrico Toti held his gun fire until he was in a favourable position to launch a torpedo, but both ships were so close that an angered Italian gunner threw his shoes at the head of his British counterpart as he could not yet fire the gun.

Until 1988 it was believed the ship sunk by Enrico Toti was Rainbow, however Rainbow is now believed to have been sunk by the Italian steamer Antonietta Costa in a collision on 4 October.

Rainbow had been ordered to leave the area on 13 October, she would have been gone 26–30 hours before the action described above began. Even at the modest speed of 6 knots (11 km/h), Rainbow would have been 200 nautical miles (370 km) away from the spot at the time of the action. The only boat in Enrico Toti's vicinity was Triad.
