= Cantiere navale del Muggiano =

Defunct Italian shipbuilding company

- Industry: Shipbuilding
- Founded: 1883
- Headquarters: Muggiano, Italy
- Parent: Fincantieri

Cantiere navale del Muggiano (Muggiano Shipyard) is a defunct Italian shipbuilding company. Founded in 1883 in Muggiano, it was combined with the Cantiere navale di Ancona into the Officine e Cantieri Liguri-Anconetani in 1899 and then, together with the Cantiere navale di Palermo, amalgamated into Cantieri Navali Riuniti (CNR) on 31 January 1906. FIAT-San Giorgio, owners of the adjacent submarine shipyard, purchased the shipyard from CNR in 1913 to increase their production capacity. Gio. Ansaldo & C. bought out FIAT in 1918 and the company was renamed Ansaldo-San Giorgio. Ansaldo was forced to sell its half to Attilio Odero in 1921. Once Odero gained control of the Vickers-Terni armament works in 1927, he amalgamated the shipyard with his other facilities into Odero-Terni. He acquired the Cantiere navale fratelli Orlando in 1929 and renamed the company, Società per la Costruzione di Navi, Macchine ed Artiglierie Odero-Terni-Orlando (OTO) (later OTO Melara). It was merged into Fincantieri in 1984.

== Bibliography ==
- Brescia, Maurizio (2012). Mussolini's Navy: A Reference Guide to the Regina Marina 1930–45. Annapolis, Maryland: Naval Institute Press. ISBN 978-1-59114-544-8.
