= Italian submarine Ondina =

Italian submarine

History

Kingdom of Italy
- Name: Ondina
- Namesake: Undine
- Builder: Cantieri Riuniti dell'Adriatico, Monfalcone
- Laid down: 1931
- Launched: 2 December 1933
- Fate: Sunk, 11 July 1942

General characteristics
- Class & type: Sirena-class submarine
- Displacement: 691 t (680 long tons) (surfaced); 850 t (837 long tons) (submerged)
- Length: 60.18 m (197 ft 5 in)
- Beam: 6.45 m (21 ft 2 in)
- Draft: 4.7 m (15 ft 5 in)
- Installed power: 1,350 bhp (1,010 kW) (diesels); 800 hp (600 kW) (electric motors)
- Propulsion: 2 shafts; diesel-electric; 2 × diesel engines; 2 × electric motors
- Speed: 14 knots (26 km/h; 16 mph) (surfaced); 7.5 knots (13.9 km/h; 8.6 mph) (submerged)
- Range: 5,000 nmi (9,300 km; 5,800 mi) at 8 knots (15 km/h; 9.2 mph) (surfaced); 72 nmi (133 km; 83 mi) at 4 knots (7.4 km/h; 4.6 mph) (submerged)
- Armament: 1 × single 100 mm (3.9 in) deck gun; 2–4 × single 13.2 mm (0.52 in) machine guns; 6 × 533 mm (21 in) torpedo tubes (4 bow, 2 stern)

Ondina was one of a dozen Sirena-class submarines, the second sub-class of the 600 Series of coastal submarines built for the Regia Marina (Royal Italian Navy) during the early 1930s.

== Design and description ==
The Sirena class was an improved and enlarged version of the preceding Argonauta-class submarines. They displaced 691 metric tons (680 long tons) surfaced and 850 metric tons (837 long tons) submerged. The submarines were 61.5 meters (201 ft 9 in) long, had a beam of 5.7 meters (18 ft 8 in) and a draft of 4.7 meters (15 ft 5 in). Their crew numbered 45 officers and enlisted men.

For surface running, the boats were powered by two 675-brake-horsepower (503 kW) diesel engines, each driving one propeller shaft. When submerged each propeller was driven by a 400-horsepower (298 kW) electric motor. They could reach 14 knots (26 km/h; 16 mph) on the surface and 7.5 knots (13.9 km/h; 8.6 mph) underwater. On the surface, the Sirena class had a range of 5,000 nautical miles (9,300 km; 5,800 mi) at 8 knots (15 km/h; 9.2 mph); submerged, they had a range of 72 nmi (133 km; 83 mi) at 4 knots (7.4 km/h; 4.6 mph).

The boats were armed with six 53.3-centimeter (21 in) torpedo tubes, four in the bow and two in the stern for which they carried a total of 12 torpedoes. They were also armed with a single 100 mm (3.9 in) deck gun forward of the conning tower for combat on the surface. The anti-aircraft armament consisted of two or four 13.2-millimeter (0.52 in) machine guns.

== Construction and career ==
Ondina was laid down by Cantieri Riuniti dell'Adriatico at their Monfalcone shipyard in 1931, launched on 2 December 1933 and completed the following year.

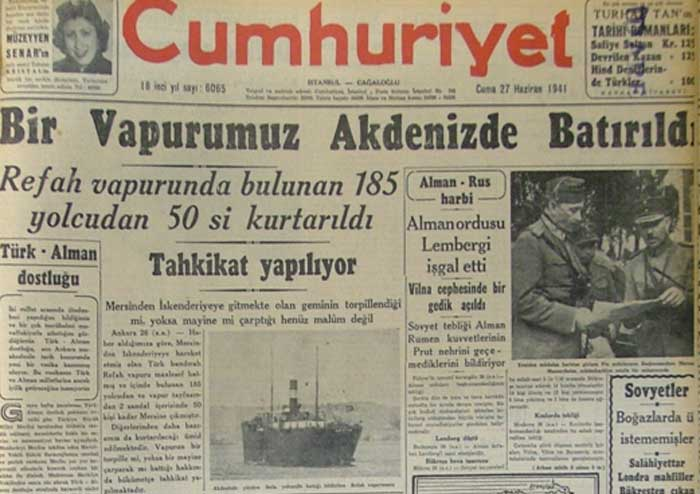
Refah tragedy in the daily newspaper Cumhuriyet on June 27, 1941

On 23 June 1941 Ondina under the command of Corrado Dal Pozzo at location indicated as (36.08N-34.44E) in Italian naval records. Ondina and Italian Naval records show the submarine fired a torpedo and sank the Turkish Transport vessel Refah of whom only 32 survived out of 200 on board.

Ondina was also sunk a year later by the warships HMSAS Protea, HMSAS Southern Maid (both Southern-class whalers) and Supermarine Walrus warplanes near Cyprus At (34-35 N, 34-56 E) on 11 July 1942. However, the command of Ondina was under Lieutenant Gabriele Adolfi at that time. The Italian sailors from Ondina were recovered by the warships. (5 killed/41 survived).
