= Italian submarine Naiade =

Italian submarine

History

Kingdom of Italy
- Name: Naiade
- Namesake: Naiad
- Builder: Cantieri Riuniti dell'Adriatico, Monfalcone
- Laid down: 1931
- Launched: 27 March 1933
- Fate: Sunk, 14 December 1940

General characteristics
- Class & type: Sirena-class submarine
- Displacement: 691 t (680 long tons) (surfaced); 850 t (837 long tons) (submerged)
- Length: 60.18 m (197 ft 5 in)
- Beam: 6.45 m (21 ft 2 in)
- Draft: 4.7 m (15 ft 5 in)
- Installed power: 1,350 bhp (1,010 kW) (diesels); 800 hp (600 kW) (electric motors)
- Propulsion: 2 shafts; diesel-electric; 2 × diesel engines; 2 × electric motors
- Speed: 14 knots (26 km/h; 16 mph) (surfaced); 7.5 knots (13.9 km/h; 8.6 mph) (submerged)
- Range: 5,000 nmi (9,300 km; 5,800 mi) at 8 knots (15 km/h; 9.2 mph) (surfaced); 72 nmi (133 km; 83 mi) at 4 knots (7.4 km/h; 4.6 mph) (submerged)
- Armament: 1 × single 100 mm (3.9 in) deck gun; 2–4 × single 13.2 mm (0.52 in) machine guns; 6 × 533 mm (21 in) torpedo tubes (4 bow, 2 stern)

Naiade was one of a dozen Sirena-class submarines, the second sub-class of the 600 Series of coastal submarines built for the Regia Marina (Royal Italian Navy) during the early 1930s.

== Design and description ==
The Sirena class was an improved and enlarged version of the preceding Argonauta-class submarines. They displaced 691 metric tons (680 long tons) surfaced and 850 metric tons (837 long tons) submerged. The submarines were 61.5 meters (201 ft 9 in) long, had a beam of 5.7 meters (18 ft 8 in) and a draft of 4.7 meters (15 ft 5 in). Their crew numbered 45 officers and enlisted men.

For surface running, the boats were powered by two 675-brake-horsepower (503 kW) diesel engines, each driving one propeller shaft. When submerged each propeller was driven by a 400-horsepower (298 kW) electric motor. They could reach 14 knots (26 km/h; 16 mph) on the surface and 7.5 knots (13.9 km/h; 8.6 mph) underwater. On the surface, the Sirena class had a range of 5,000 nautical miles (9,300 km; 5,800 mi) at 8 knots (15 km/h; 9.2 mph); submerged, they had a range of 72 nmi (133 km; 83 mi) at 4 knots (7.4 km/h; 4.6 mph).

The boats were armed with six 53.3-centimeter (21 in) torpedo tubes, four in the bow and two in the stern for which they carried a total of 12 torpedoes. They were also armed with a single 100 mm (3.9 in) deck gun forward of the conning tower for combat on the surface. The anti-aircraft armament consisted of two or four 13.2-millimeter (0.52 in) machine guns.

== Construction and career ==
Naiade was laid down by Cantieri Riuniti dell'Adriatico at their Monfalcone shipyard in 1931, launched on 27 March 1933 and completed the following year.
