= Italian submarine Topazio =

Italian submarine

History

Kingdom of Italy
- Name: Topazio
- Namesake: Topaz
- Builder: Cantieri navali del Quarnaro, Fiume
- Laid down: 1931
- Launched: 15 May 1933
- Fate: Sunk, 12 September 1943

General characteristics
- Class & type: Sirena-class submarine
- Displacement: 691 t (680 long tons) (surfaced); 850 t (837 long tons) (submerged)
- Length: 60.18 m (197 ft 5 in)
- Beam: 6.45 m (21 ft 2 in)
- Draft: 4.7 m (15 ft 5 in)
- Installed power: 1,350 bhp (1,010 kW) (diesels); 800 hp (600 kW) (electric motors)
- Propulsion: 2 shafts; diesel-electric; 2 × diesel engines; 2 × electric motors
- Speed: 14 knots (26 km/h; 16 mph) (surfaced); 7.5 knots (13.9 km/h; 8.6 mph) (submerged)
- Range: 5,000 nmi (9,300 km; 5,800 mi) at 8 knots (15 km/h; 9.2 mph) (surfaced); 72 nmi (133 km; 83 mi) at 4 knots (7.4 km/h; 4.6 mph) (submerged)
- Armament: 1 × single 100 mm (3.9 in) deck gun; 2–4 × single 13.2 mm (0.52 in) machine guns; 6 × 533 mm (21 in) torpedo tubes (4 bow, 2 stern)

Topazio was one of a dozen Sirena-class submarines, the second sub-class of the 600 Series of coastal submarines built for the Regia Marina (Royal Italian Navy) during the early 1930s. She played a minor role in the Spanish Civil War of 1936–1939 supporting the Spanish Nationalists.

== Design and description ==
The Sirena class was an improved and enlarged version of the preceding Argonauta-class submarines. They displaced 691 metric tons (680 long tons) surfaced and 850 metric tons (837 long tons) submerged. The submarines were 61.5 meters (201 ft 9 in) long, had a beam of 5.7 meters (18 ft 8 in) and a draft of 4.7 meters (15 ft 5 in). Their crew numbered 45 officers and enlisted men.

For surface running, the boats were powered by two 675-brake-horsepower (503 kW) diesel engines, each driving one propeller shaft. When submerged each propeller was driven by a 400-horsepower (298 kW) electric motor. They could reach 14 knots (26 km/h; 16 mph) on the surface and 7.5 knots (13.9 km/h; 8.6 mph) underwater. On the surface, the Sirena class had a range of 5,000 nautical miles (9,300 km; 5,800 mi) at 8 knots (15 km/h; 9.2 mph); submerged, they had a range of 72 nmi (133 km; 83 mi) at 4 knots (7.4 km/h; 4.6 mph).

The boats were armed with six 53.3-centimeter (21 in) torpedo tubes, four in the bow and two in the stern for which they carried a total of 12 torpedoes. They were also armed with a single 100 mm (3.9 in) deck gun forward of the conning tower for combat on the surface. The anti-aircraft armament consisted of two or four 13.2-millimeter (0.52 in) machine guns.

== Construction and career ==
Topazio was laid down by Cantieri navali del Quarnaro at their Fiume shipyard in 1931, launched on 15 May 1933 and completed the following year. During the Spanish Civil War, she bombarded Valencia with 34 shells on the night of 12/13 February 1937.
