= Italian submarines of World War II =

The Italian submarine fleet of World War II was one of the largest in the world at the time, with 116 submarines. It saw action during the Second World War, serving mainly in the Mediterranean and the Atlantic. During the conflict 88 submarines, 75% of its total strength, were lost. In the Mediterranean, Italian submarines sank 21 merchantmen and 13 enemy warships for a total of around 100,000 ton; in addition, they were often used for carrying the crews and human torpedoes of the Decima Flottiglia MAS (a unit which sank or disabled warships totalling 78,000 tons and 20 merchant ships totalling 130,000 GRT). In the Atlantic, Italian submarines sank Allied merchant ships totalling 593,864 tons.

== Construction history ==
The submarine fleet available to the Italian Royal Navy (the Regia Marina) in World War II was the product of a long term build-up during the interwar years, despite the prevailing economic and political pressures of the period.

After World War I Italy had a fleet of 47 submarines in various classes; these were mostly obsolete and she was interested in replacing them. To this end the Regia Marina made plans for a fleet of vessels in three Types:

- Type I ocean-going:
- Type 2 coastal/sea-going;
- Type 3 mine layers.
- The Navy also invested time and resources in midget submarines and underwater special forces.

At the same time the major powers were negotiating an arms limitation treaty at the 1922 Washington Naval Conference. Whilst there was discussion of banning submarines altogether, and to outlaw their use (a course favoured by Britain) both Italy and France opposed this. However the conference did place restrictions on the number and size of warships of various types that nations could build. The ocean-going submarine was restricted to a 1500-ton surface displacement, while the coastal submarine was limited to 600 tons, though there was no limit placed on the numbers of these vessels that could be built.

In the inter-war years : between 1925 and 1929 Italy built a series of ocean-going submarines in a number of small classes, in order to find the most suitable designs for expansion. Work was done principally by the design bureaux of Cavallini, resulting in the Mameli and Settembrini classes, and of Bernardis, building the Pisani, Bandiera, and Squalo classes. They also commissioned a design by Ansaldo, the Balilla class.

This was followed in the 1930s by the Archimede, Brin, and, just prior to war, Liuzzi classes from Cavallini, and the Glauco, Marcello, and later, Marconi classes from Bernardis. They also ordered the Calvi and Argo classes from Ansaldo. Just prior to war, in 1939, the Italians also commissioned the Cagni class, designed specifically as a commerce raider with a long range and armed with 14 Torpedo Tubes of 17.7in calibre (these being more suitable against merchant ships). These were built to a CRDA/Bernardis design.

For coastal and medium range operations, the Italian Navy ordered a series of submarine classes, known as the 600 series. This commenced in 1929 with the Argonauta class, followed by the Sirena, Perla, Adua, and Acciao classes, all to Bernardis designs.

For minelaying operations the Italians built the Bragadin class in 1927 (a Bernardis design), followed in 1930 by the Micca, and then the Foca class, from Cavallini.

Italy's interest in midget submarines resulted in the CA class, built in 1938, and followed during the war by CB, CC and CM classes. She also developed a manned torpedo, the SLC, an update of an Italian First World War design, for use by the Navy's special forces.

During World War II Italy also had designs for a wartime building programme. This was the Flutto class of submarines, an enlarged 600 series design for medium-range use, with mass production under wartime conditions in mind. 48 vessels, in three series (Types) were ordered, but only 12 were completed. Also during the war Italy came to require a submersible transport; designs for this led to the R, or Romolo class of boats. Again, though 12 were ordered, only two were completed.

== Design features ==
Italian submarines of this period were of various types, depending on the design bureau responsible. Bernardis favoured a single hull design, for better submerged characteristics, but adding side blisters for stability on the surface. This design was preferred by the Navy. Cavallini used a double hull format, or a partial double hull with saddle tanks, to aid surface performance; this design was found to give better results. Ansaldo also used the double hull, to emphasize surface handling. These vessels compared unfavorably with their British and German counterparts, with comparatively slow diving times and poor handling underwater. One feature that caused problems was the large conning tower, making the boat more visible on the surface, and slowing the dive time. During the war many of these were reconstructed to remedy this fault.

== Service history ==
In 1939 the Regia Marina had 107 submarines; this included 7 vessels of World War I vintage confined to training. Eight more were commissioned prior to joining hostilities, and a further 30 were commissioned during the war. The Italian submarine force was designed and intended to operate mainly in Mediterranean, in support of battle fleet or on scouting and patrolling missions, although its ocean-going vessels were also intended for the Atlantic. It also had a number of boats stationed overseas in Italy's colonial empire.

At the joining of hostilities in June 1940 Italy had 115 submarines, of which 84 were operational; however 10 were lost in the first twenty days of action, due partly to flaws in boat quality or training, and partly due to reckless bravado. Thereafter the Italians never had more than 25 to 30 boats at sea at any one time. The commander of the Italian submarine fleet on 10 June 1940 was Admiral Mario Falangola, who was replaced by Admiral Antonio Legnani in December 1941.

Soon after June 1940 Italy dispatched a submarine force to the Atlantic, honouring a commitment to Germany to help in the Atlantic campaign. Code-named BETASOM, this force was stationed at Bordeaux in Occupied France. 32 boats in total served in the Atlantic, equaling the German numbers at the time. Italian submarines operating in the Atlantic overall sank 109 allied merchant ships totaling 593,864 tons.

Half of these Italian boats later returned to the Mediterranean, or were converted to transports for operations to the Far East.

In the Mediterranean the submarine force suffered heavily in the face of intense anti submarine warfare, and in attacks on heavily guarded convoys and naval formations. Results were modest, with only 21 merchantmen and 13 enemy warships sunk (for a total of around 100,000 tons); one reason for such a modest score was the lack of targets (with most of them being harder-to-hit warships, and the merchant ships being under heavy escort), and another was the outdated doctrine employed at the beginning of the war (with static patrols, and attacks being executed by firing only one or two torpedoes), although this aspect was being corrected by 1942 (as proven during Operation Pedestal, when a more aggressive and dynamic conduct met with considerable success). In 1943 at Italy's surrender the Regia Marina had 34 boats operational, having lost 92 vessels in action (over two-thirds of their number). During the conflict 88 submarines, some two-thirds of its total strength, were lost. 3,021 men of the Italian submarine service were lost at sea during the war.

== Classes ==
Type 1 ocean-going submarines

- Mameli class : 4 units, built 1926–1928
- Settembrini class : 2 units, built 1930–1931
- Pisani class : 4 units, built 1927–1928
- Bandiera class : 4 units, built 1929
- Squalo class : 4 units, built 1930
- Balilla class : 4 units, built 1927–1928
- Archimede class : 4 units, built 1933–1934
- Brin class : 5 units, built 1938–1939
- Liuzzi class : 4 units, built 1939–1940
- Glauco class : 2 units, built 1935
- Marcello class : 11 units, built 1937–1939
- Marconi class : 6 units, built 1939–1940
- Calvi class : 3 units built 1935
- Argo class : 2 units, built 1936

Type 2 coastal/sea-going submarines (Series 600)

- Argonauta class : 7 units, built 1931–32
- Sirena class : 12 units, built 1933
- Perla class : 10 units, built 1936
- Adua class : 17 units, built 1936–38
- Acciao class : 13 units, built 1941–42

Type 3 minelayer submarines

- Bragadin class : 2 units, built 1929–30
- Micca class : 1 unit, built 1935
- Foca class : 3 units, built 1937–38

Sea-going submarines (wartime construction)

- Flutto class : 48 ordered in 3 series; 13 built 1942–44
  - Type 1 : 12 ordered, 10 completed
  - Type 2 : 24 ordered, 3 completed
  - Type 3 : 12 ordered, none completed

Commerce raider submarines

- Cagni class : 4 units, built 1940

Transport submarines

- R/Romolo class : 12 ordered, 2 built 1943

Midget submarines

- CA class : 4 units, built 1937–43
- CB class : 22 units, built 1942–43
- CC class : 4 ordered, none completed
- CM class : 3 ordered, none completed

Ex-World War I submarines

- H class : 8 units, 5 still in service in 1939
- X class : 2 units, both still in service in 1939
