= Sirena-class submarine =

Class of submarines

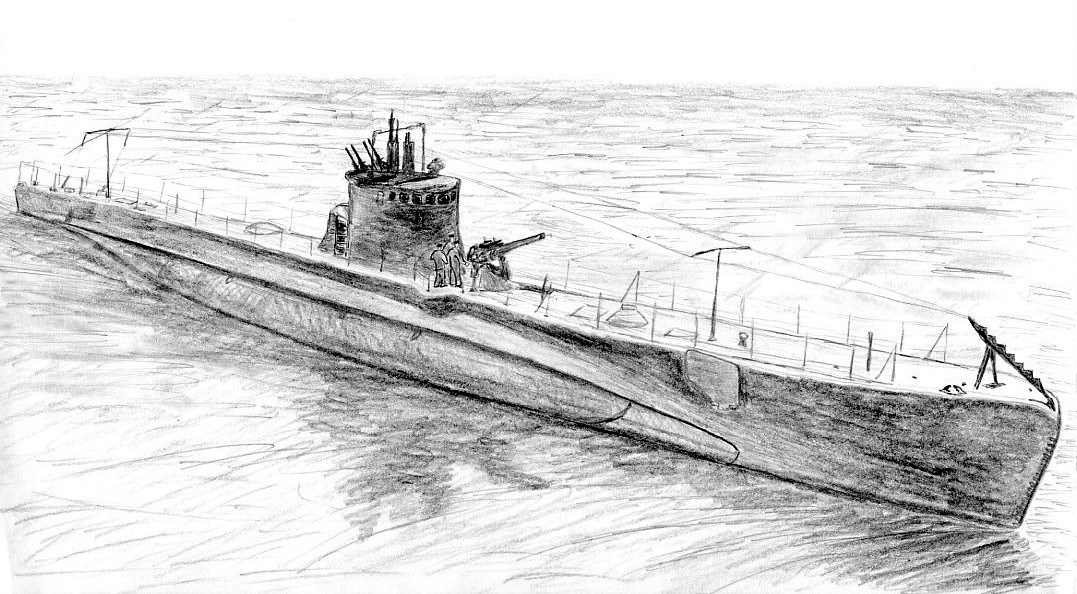
- Sirena Class

Class overview
- Operators: Regia Marina
- Preceded by: Argonauta class
- Succeeded by: Perla class
- Built: 1931–1934
- In commission: 1933–1948
- Completed: 12
- Lost: 11
- Scrapped: 1

General characteristics
- Type: Submarine
- Displacement: 691 t (680 long tons) (surfaced); 850 t (837 long tons) (submerged)
- Length: 60.18 m (197 ft 5 in)
- Beam: 6.45 m (21 ft 2 in)
- Draft: 4.7 m (15 ft 5 in)
- Installed power: 1,350 bhp (1,010 kW) (diesels); 800 hp (600 kW) (electric motors)
- Propulsion: 2 shafts; diesel-electric; 2 × diesel engines; 2 × electric motors
- Speed: 14 knots (26 km/h; 16 mph) (surfaced); 7.5 knots (13.9 km/h; 8.6 mph) (submerged)
- Range: 5,000 nmi (9,300 km; 5,800 mi) at 8 knots (15 km/h; 9.2 mph) (surfaced); 72 nmi (133 km; 83 mi) at 4 knots (7.4 km/h; 4.6 mph) (submerged)
- Armament: 1 × single 100 mm (3.9 in) deck gun; 2–4 × single 13.2 mm (0.52 in) machine guns; 6 × 533 mm (21 in) torpedo tubes (4 bow, 2 stern)

The Sirena-class submarines were the second sub-class of the 600 Series of coastal submarines built for the Regia Marina (Royal Italian Navy) during the early 1930s. Of the dozen boats built of this class, only one survived World War II. This class of submarines also ended up being the basis for Yugoslav Sutjeska-class submarine.

== Design and description ==
The Sirena class was an improved and enlarged version of the preceding Argonauta-class submarines. They displaced 691 metric tons (680 long tons) surfaced and 850 metric tons (837 long tons) submerged. The submarines were 61.5 meters (201 ft 9 in) long, had a beam of 5.7 meters (18 ft 8 in) and a draft of 4.7 meters (15 ft 5 in). Their crew numbered 45 officers and enlisted men.

For surface running, the boats were powered by two 675-brake-horsepower (503 kW) diesel engines, each driving one propeller shaft. When submerged each propeller was driven by a 400-horsepower (298 kW) electric motor. They could reach 14 knots (26 km/h; 16 mph) on the surface and 7.5 knots (13.9 km/h; 8.6 mph) underwater. On the surface, the Sirena class had a range of 5,000 nautical miles (9,300 km; 5,800 mi) at 8 knots (15 km/h; 9.2 mph); submerged, they had a range of 72 nmi (133 km; 83 mi) at 4 knots (7.4 km/h; 4.6 mph).

The boats were armed with six 53.3-centimeter (21 in) torpedo tubes, four in the bow and two in the stern for which they carried a total of 12 torpedoes. They were also armed with a single 100 mm (3.9 in) deck gun forward of the conning tower for combat on the surface. The anti-aircraft armament consisted of two or four 13.2-millimeter (0.52 in) machine guns.

== Ships ==
Construction data
Ship	Builder	Laid down	Launched	Commissioned	Fate
Ametista	Odero-Terni-Orlando, Muggiano	16 September 1931	26 April 1933	1 April 1934	Scuttled 12 September 1943
Anfitrite	Cantieri Riuniti dell'Adriatico, Monfalcone	11 July 1931	5 August 1933	22 March 1934	Sunk 6 March 1941
Diamante	Cantieri navali Tosi di Taranto, Taranto	11 May 1931	21 May 1933	18 November 1933	Sunk 20 June 1940
Galatea	Cantieri Riuniti dell'Adriatico, Monfalcone	18 July 1931	5 October 1933	25 June 1934	Struck 1 February 1948
Naiade	Cantieri Riuniti dell'Adriatico, Monfalcone	9 May 1931	27 March 1933	14 November 1933	Sunk 14 December 1940
Nereide	Cantieri Riuniti dell'Adriatico, Monfalcone	30 May 1931	25 May 1933	18 February 1934	Sunk 13 July 1943
Ondina	Cantieri Riuniti dell'Adriatico, Monfalcone	25 July 1931	2 December 1933	19 September 1934	Sunk 11 July 1942
Rubino	Cantieri navali del Quarnaro, Fiume	26 September 1931	29 March 1933	21 March 1934	Sunk 29 June 1940
Sirena	Cantieri Reuniti dell'Adriatico, Monfalcone	1 May 1931	26 January 1933	2 October 1933	Scuttled 9 September 1943
Smeraldo	Cantieri navali Tosi di Taranto, Taranto	25 May 1931	23 July 1933	29 November 1933	Lost ca. 25 September 1941
Topazio	Cantieri navali del Quarnaro, Fiume	26 September 1931	15 May 1933	26 April 1934	Sunk 12 September 1943
Zaffiro	Odero-Terni-Orlando, Muggiano	16 September 1931	28 June 1933	4 June 1934	Sunk 9 June 1942

== See also ==
- Italian submarines of World War II
