= HMS Ultimatum =

Submarine of the Royal Navy

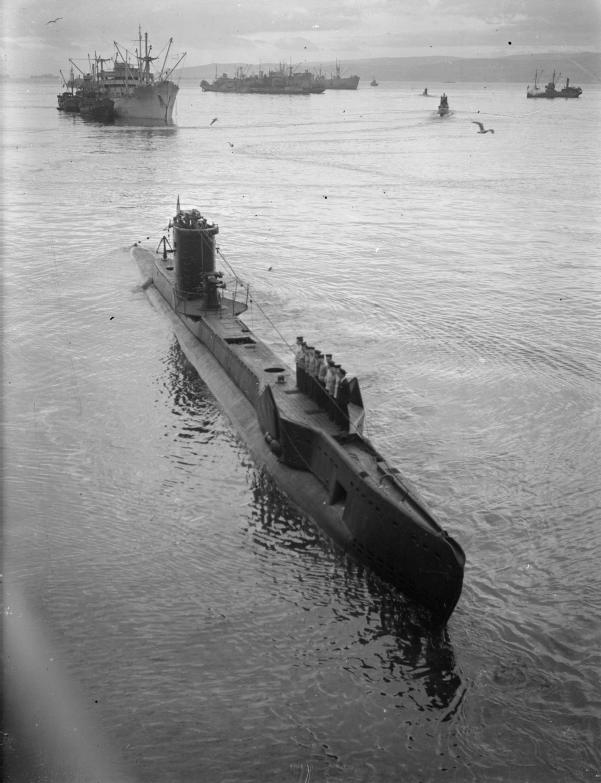
- HMS Ultimatum setting off from Holy Loch

History

United Kingdom
- Name: HMS Ultimatum
- Builder: Vickers-Armstrongs, Barrow-in-Furness
- Laid down: 19 June 1940
- Launched: 11 February 1941
- Commissioned: 29 July 1941
- Fate: Sold for scrap on 23 December 1949, broken up 1950
- Badge: HMS Ultimatum's badge

General characteristics
- Class & type: U-class submarine
- Displacement: Surfaced - 540 tons standard, 630 tons full load; Submerged - 730 tons
- Length: 58.22 m (191 ft)
- Beam: 4.90 m (16 ft 1 in)
- Draught: 4.62 m (15 ft 2 in)
- Propulsion: 2 shaft diesel-electric; 2 Paxman Ricardo diesel generators + electric motors; 615 / 825 hp
- Speed: 11.25 knots max surfaced; 10 knots max submerged
- Complement: 27-31
- Armament: 4 bow internal 21 inch (533 mm) torpedo tubes - 8 - 10 torpedoes; 1 - 3-inch (76 mm) gun

HMS Ultimatum (P34) was a Royal Navy U-class submarine built by Vickers-Armstrongs at Barrow-in-Furness, and part of the third group of that class. So far she has been the only ship of the Royal Navy to bear the name Ultimatum.

== Career ==
Ultimatum spent her wartime career in the Mediterranean, where she sank the Italian passenger ship Dalmatia L., a German sailing vessel and the Italian submarine Ammiraglio Millo. She was commanded from January 1943 by Lieutenant Hedley Kett. On 30 October 1943, Ultimatum attacked a German U-boat southeast of Toulon, France. This attack was against U-73 but it inflicted no damage. Ultimatum had been credited with sinking U-431 in this attack. However U-431 was sunk with all hands on 21 October 1943 in the Mediterranean off Algiers by depth charges from a British Wellington aircraft. U-431's fate was revised in November 1987 by the Foreign Documents Section of the British Ministry of Defence.

Ultimatum also unsuccessfully attacked the Italian merchant ships Ravello, Luciano Manara and Unione, the Italian submarine Zaffiro and the German auxiliary patrol vessel Uj 6073 / Nimeth Allah. She had more luck on 2 May 1944, when she shelled the harbour of Kalamata, Greece, sinking two sailing vessels, destroying five on the slips and damaging another. She also went on to attack a group of small German vessels, successfully hitting and sinking the German barge F 811.

Ultimatum survived the war and was sold to be broken up for scrap on 23 December 1949, and was scrapped at Port Glasgow in February 1950.
