= Glauco-class submarine =

Italian submarine class

Class overview
- Name: Glauco-class
- Builders: Cantieri Riuniti dell' Adriatico, Trieste
- Operators: Regia Marina; Italian Navy
- Built: 1931–1936
- In commission: 1935–1948
- Completed: 2
- Lost: 1
- Scrapped: 1

General characteristics
- Type: Submarine
- Displacement: 1,071 t (1,054 long tons) (surfaced); 1,326 t (1,305 long tons) (submerged)
- Length: 73 m (239 ft 6 in)
- Beam: 7.2 m (23 ft 7 in)
- Draft: 5.12 m (16 ft 10 in)
- Installed power: 3,000 bhp (2,200 kW) (diesels); 1,200 hp (890 kW) (electric motors)
- Propulsion: 2 shafts; Diesel-electric; 2 × diesel engines; 2 × electric motors
- Speed: 17 knots (31 km/h; 20 mph) (surfaced); 8 knots (15 km/h; 9.2 mph) (submerged)
- Range: 9,760 nmi (18,080 km; 11,230 mi) at 8 knots (15 km/h; 9.2 mph) (surfaced); 110 nmi (200 km; 130 mi) at 3 knots (5.6 km/h; 3.5 mph) (submerged)
- Armament: 2 × single 100 mm (3.9 in) deck guns; 2 × single 13.2 mm (0.52 in) machine guns; 8 × 533 mm (21 in) torpedo tubes (4 bow, 4 stern)

The Glauco class was a pair of submarines ordered by the Portuguese government, but were taken over and completed for the Regia Marina (Royal Italian Navy) during the 1930s. They played a minor role in the Spanish Civil War of 1936–1939 supporting the Spanish Nationalists.

== Design and description ==
The Glauco-class submarines were improved versions of the preceding Squalo class. They displaced 1,071 metric tons (1,054 long tons) surfaced and 1,326 metric tons (1,305 long tons) submerged. The submarines were 73 meters (239 ft 6 in) long, had a beam of 7.2 meters (23 ft 7 in) and a draft of 5.12 meters (16 ft 10 in).

For surface running, the boats were powered by two 1,500-brake-horsepower (1,119 kW) diesel engines, each driving one propeller shaft. When submerged each propeller was driven by a 600-horsepower (447 kW) electric motor. They could reach 17 knots (31 km/h; 20 mph) on the surface and 8 knots (15 km/h; 9.2 mph) underwater. On the surface, the Glauco class had a range of 9,760 nautical miles (18,080 km; 11,230 mi) at 8 knots (15 km/h; 9.2 mph); submerged, they had a range of 110 nmi (200 km; 130 mi) at 3 knots (5.6 km/h; 3.5 mph).

The boats were armed with eight internal 53.3 cm (21 in) torpedo tubes, four each in the bow and stern. They carried a total of 14 torpedoes. They were also armed with two 100 mm (3.9 in) deck guns, one each fore and aft of the conning tower, for combat on the surface. Their anti-aircraft armament consisted of one or two 13.2 mm (0.52 in) machine guns.

== Ships ==
- Glauco
- Otaria

== Service ==
Both boats were built by CRDA in its Trieste shipyard. The submarines had initially been ordered in 1931, but were acquired by the Italians when Portugal cancelled the order. Both boats were launched in 1935, and they saw action in the Spanish Civil War and the Second World War. Glauco was badly damaged by the British destroyer HMS Wishart and scuttled by her own crew on 27 June 1941, west of Gibraltar; Otaria was surrendered to the Allies in 1943 and used for training until it was sent to the junkyard in 1948.
