= Italian submarine Jalea (1932) =

Italian submarine

History

Kingdom of Italy
- Name: Jalea
- Builder: Odero-Terni-Orlando, Muggiano
- Laid down: 1930
- Launched: 15 June 1932
- Completed: 1933
- Fate: Discarded, 1 February 1948

General characteristics
- Class & type: Argonauta-class submarine
- Displacement: 660 t (650 long tons) (surfaced); 813 t (800 long tons) (submerged)
- Length: 61.5 m (202 ft)
- Beam: 5.7 m (18 ft 8 in)
- Draft: 4.7 m (15 ft 5 in)
- Installed power: 1,500 bhp (1,100 kW) (diesels); 800 hp (600 kW) (electric motors)
- Propulsion: 2 shafts; diesel-electric; 2 × diesel engines; 2 × electric motors
- Speed: 14 knots (26 km/h; 16 mph) (surfaced); 8 knots (15 km/h; 9.2 mph) (submerged)
- Range: 5,000 nmi (9,300 km; 5,800 mi) at 8 knots (15 km/h; 9.2 mph) (surfaced); 110 nmi (200 km; 130 mi) at 3 knots (5.6 km/h; 3.5 mph) (submerged)
- Test depth: 80 m (260 ft)
- Armament: 1 × single 102 mm (4 in) deck gun; 2 × single 13.2 mm (0.52 in) machine guns; 6 × 533 mm (21 in) torpedo tubes (4 bow, 2 stern)

Jalea was one of seven Argonauta-class submarines built for the Regia Marina (Royal Italian Navy) during the early 1930s. She played a minor role in the Spanish Civil War of 1936–1939 supporting the Spanish Nationalists.

== Design and description ==
The Argonauta class was derived from the earlier Squalo-class submarines. They displaced 660 metric tons (650 long tons) surfaced and 813 metric tons (800 long tons) submerged. The submarines were 61.5 meters (201 ft 9 in) long, had a beam of 5.7 meters (18 ft 8 in) and a draft of 4.7 meters (15 ft 5 in). They had an operational diving depth of 80 meters (260 ft). Their crew numbered 44 officers and enlisted men.

For surface running, the boats were powered by two 750-brake-horsepower (559 kW) diesel engines, each driving one propeller shaft. When submerged each propeller was driven by a 400-horsepower (298 kW) electric motor. They could reach 14 knots (26 km/h; 16 mph) on the surface and 8 knots (15 km/h; 9.2 mph) underwater. On the surface, the Settembrini class had a range of 5,000 nautical miles (9,300 km; 5,800 mi) at 8 knots (15 km/h; 9.2 mph); submerged, they had a range of 110 nmi (200 km; 130 mi) at 3 knots (5.6 km/h; 3.5 mph).

The boats were armed with six 53.3-centimeter (21 in) torpedo tubes, four in the bow and two in the stern for which they carried a total of 12 torpedoes. They were also armed with a single 102-millimeter (4 in) deck gun forward of the conning tower for combat on the surface. Their anti-aircraft armament consisted of two single 13.2-millimeter (0.52 in) machine guns.

== Construction and career ==
Jalea was laid down by Odero-Terni-Orlando at their Muggiano shipyard in 1930, launched on 15 June 1932 and completed the following year. During the Spanish Civil War, she unsuccessfully attacked the 6,942-gross register ton (GRT) mail steamer SS Villa de Madrid off Barcelona on 25 December 1936. Both torpedoes missed and one of them beached itself without exploding. It was identified as Italian built and proved that Italy was covertly supporting the Nationalists. The submarine was on a patrol off Cartagena when she attacked the Republican destroyers Churruca and Almirante Antequera on 12 August 1937. One torpedo destroyed one of the former's boiler rooms, killing four men and wounding eight and crippling the ship. Jalea accidentally surfaced while attacked which allowed observers to determine that she was of foreign origin, not a boat in Nationalist service.
