= MS Augustus =

MS Augustus may refer to two Italian ocean liners that have been named after the Roman emperor Augustus:

- MS Augustus (1926), a combined ocean liner and cruise ship built in 1927 for Navigazione Generale Italiana, later transferred to Italian Line.
- MS Augustus (1950), a 27,090 GRT, luxury ocean liner built in 1950 for Italian Line.
