= Italian ship Caracciolo =

Francesco Caracciolo or Ammiraglio Caracciolo or simply Caracciolo was the name of at least two ships of the Italian Navy named in honour of Francesco Caracciolo and may refer to:

- Italian corvette Caracciolo (1811), a sail corvette launched in 1811 for the Neapolitan Navy, originally as Amalia and later renamed Maria Carolina, and incorporated into the Regia Marina after the unification of Italy.
- Italian corvette Caracciolo (1869), a screw corvette launched in 1869.
- Italian battleship Francesco Caracciolo, a Francesco Caracciolo-class battleship laid down in 1914 and launched in 1920. She was never completed.
- Italian submarine Ammiraglio Caracciolo, a Cagni-class submarine launched in 1940 and sunk in 1941.
