= Cagni-class submarine =

Italian submarine class

- Italian Cagni-class submarine (Ammiraglio Cagni)

Class overview
- Name: Cagni class
- Builders: CRDA
- Operators: Regia Marina
- Preceded by: Marconi class
- Planned: 16
- Completed: 4
- Canceled: 12
- Lost: 3
- Retired: 1

General characteristics
- Type: Submarine
- Displacement: 1,653 tons (surfaced); 2,136 (submerged)
- Length: 87.95 m (288.5 ft)
- Beam: 7.76 m (25.5 ft)
- Draught: 5.72 m (18.8 ft)
- Propulsion: 2 shafts diesel / electric; 4,370 hp (3,260 kW) surfaced / 1,800 hp (1,300 kW) submerged
- Speed: 17 knots (31 km/h) surfaced; 8.5 knots (15.7 km/h) submerged
- Range: 13,500 nmi (25,000 km; 15,500 mi) at 9 knots (17 km/h; 10 mph)
- Complement: 85
- Armament: 2 × 100 mm (4 in) / 47 caliber guns; 4 × 13.2 mm (1 in) anti-aircraft; 14 × 450 mm (18 in) torpedo tubes (8 bow, 6 stern); 36 torpedoes

The Cagni or Ammiraglio Cagni class was a class of submarines built for Italy's Regia Marina during World War II.

== Design ==
These submarines were designed as commerce raiders for oceanic operations. They had high endurance and a large torpedo load for extended patrols. A smaller 450 mm (18 in) torpedo was chosen, rather than the standard 533 mm (21 in), as the Italians believed this was adequate to deal with merchant ships. The boats were designed to have the range to sail non-stop from Italy to Kismayu, Italian Somaliland, where a new submarine base was to be built. In order to operate in the Indian Ocean Monsoon the submarines were fitted with large conning towers and armed with two 100 mm (4 in) / 47 caliber guns.

The large conning towers were rebuilt to a smaller German style as a result of war experience. Ammiraglio Cagni carried out a 4 1/2-month patrol in the South Atlantic during 1942–43. The other three boats were used as transport submarines to supply Italian forces in North Africa.

== Ships ==
All four boats were built by CRDA Monfalcone, laid down in 1939 and completed in 1941.

Ship	Namesake	Laid down	Launched	Commissioned	Service / Fate
Ammiraglio Cagni	Umberto Cagni	16 September 1939	20 July 1940	1 April 1941	Sailed to Durban South Africa September 1943 as per armistice terms, returned to Italy in 1944 for ASW training when Italy was on the allied side. , Broken up 1948
Ammiraglio Caracciolo	Francesco Caracciolo	16 October 1939	16 October 1940	1 June 1941	Scuttled after damage by HMS Farndale, near Bardia, 11 December 1941
Ammiraglio Millo	Enrico Millo	16 October 1939	31 August 1940	1 May 1941	Sunk by British submarine HMS Ultimatum on 14 March 1942
Ammiraglio Saint-Bon	Simone Antonio Saint-Bon	16 September 1939	6 June 1940	12 June 1941	Sunk by British submarine HMS Upholder on 5 January 1942

12 more boats were planned for the 1940 and 1941 ship building programmes but were cancelled as a result of the outbreak of World War II.

== Operational history ==
=== Ammiraglio Cagni ===
Her first operational patrols were in the Mediterranean, doing five transport missions and 16 patrols. Her first mission in the Atlantic was of 136 days, sinking the British tanker Dagomba and the Greek sloop Argo on 29 November 1942.

Ammiraglio Cagni was used in two theatres, the Mediterranean and South-Atlantic/Indian Ocean. She made 21 sorties in the Mediterranean, and 2 sorties in the South Atlantic/Indian Ocean in 1942–43.

On 9 September 1943, while on her second Atlantic sortie, she received news of the armistice. She sailed to the UK at Durban on 20 September 1943. HMS Jasmine found her, but Cagni did not surrender, as that were the terms of the Cassibile Armistice, in 1944 she returned to Italy and served as a training ship for ASW.

Mediterranean missions:
While under the command of Lieutenant Commander Charles Liannazza, on 15 October 1941, she sailed from Taranto to Bardia, with a cargo of 140 tonnes of fuel cans and ammunition. She returned to Taranto on 22 October, while en route was attacked by guns and depth charges but suffered no damage. She carried out a similar mission on 18 November. She completed further 5 offensive and 16 transport missions.

Atlantic 1st mission:
On 5 or 6 October 1942, she sailed from La Maddalena to the South-Atlantic for her 1st Atlantic mission, against the convoy "TS 23". She crossed the Strait of Gibraltar on 12 October without any contact. But on 3 November, while submerged at daytime, she attacked and sank a 3,845 GRT Elder Dempster Lines motor ship Dagomba. On 29 November, while patrolling off Cape of Good Hope, Africa (in the immediate vicinity of Cape Town), she sank the 1,995 GRT Greek ship Argo.

On 3 January 1943, she attempted to re-arm by torpedo transfer on Tazzoli, but failed due to adverse weather conditions. But she was successfully fuelled on 13 January with 45 tonnes of fuel by a German submarine.

On 15 February, in the Bay of Biscay, she was attacked from the air by bombs and machine-gun fire, leading to the death of Sergeant Gunner Michelangelo Cannistraro.

This single mission (began on 6 October 1942 in Magdalene, and ended on 20 February 1943 in Bordeaux) lasted for 136 days.

Atlantic 2nd mission (Indian Ocean 1st mission):
The second and last mission of Cagni began on 29 June 1943 and ended in Durban on 20 September 1943, lasted for over 84 days. She was commanded by Lieutenant Commander Joseph Roselli Lorenzini on this mission. She had received orders to proceed to Singapore, to attack merchant shipping in the South Atlantic and Indian Ocean, and returned with a load of rubber and tin.

On 17 July 1943, off the Canary Islands, she encountered a steamer of 5,500 GRT of unknown nationality. On 25 July, she torpedoed the 22,071 GRT UK armed merchant cruiser HMS Asturias (in position 06°52'N; 20°45'W). Asturias' boiler room and machinery spaces were flooded and she lost all power, but the badly damaged AMC managed to escape to Freetown under tow. On 30 July Ammiraglio Cagni crossed the equator, and on 28 August, she entered into Indian Ocean.

On 8 or 9 September, while just 1,800 miles from Singapore, she received the news of the armistice and was ordered to make the port of Durban. On 20 September, she arrived, was intercepted by HMS Jasmine and escorted into Durban, where she was asked to surrender, probably by officers without knowledge of armistice terms, but she refused, as doing otherwise would have gone against armistice terms under the Cassibile Armistice.

Thanks to the Italian admiral Raffaele De Courten's signing of an agreement with Andrew Cunningham that explicitly noted that the Italian ships would not have to surrender she was able to leave the UK already by late 1943.

On 8 November, she left for Taranto, where she arrived on 2 January 1944. Based in Palermo, she was used for anti-submarine training activities for Allied planes. On 10 February 1948, she was decommissioned and later broken up.

=== Ammiraglio Caracciolo ===
On 11 December 1941, she unsuccessfully attacked a British convoy and suffered damage by depth charges and gunfire from the destroyer HMS Farndale. She was scuttled to avoid capture. 53 men were rescued – and taken prisoner – by the British destroyer.

=== Ammiraglio Millo ===
Only carried out eight missions and all were transport operations. On 14 March 1942, returning from patrol in the waters of Malta, she was torpedoed and sunk by the submarine HMS Ultimatum, with the loss of 57 members of her crew.

=== Ammiraglio Saint-Bon ===
Only carried out ten missions, all transport operations. She was sunk by the submarine HMS Upholder on 5 January 1942; only three crewman survived.

== See also ==
- Italian submarines of World War II
