= STM 500 =

Shallow-water diesel-electric submarine built by Turkish defense company

The STM 500 is a Turkish modern coastal submarine of the 500-tonne class under construction since 2022. The shallow-water small diesel-electric attack submarine is being built by Turkish defense company STM with completion of the first vessel not expected until 2026. As of June 2022, the customer for the project had not yet been publicly released.

== History ==
The STM-500 was announced in 2021 at the 10th Naval Systems Seminar in August 2021 as a lower cost and more cost effective subsurface warfare option. Construction began in 2022. It is expected to require four years to complete construction, and up to six years to fully complete the project.

== Description ==
The STM-500 will displace more than 500 tonnes, have a crew of 18, and be able to transport a squad of 6 special forces personnel. It is being designed to have an endurance of 30 days and a maximum dive depth of more than 200 meters.

Specifications

Specifications as of 2025 include:

- Displacement: 623 tonnes surfaced, 700 tonnes submerged
- Length: Overall 49 metres (161 ft) , Beam: 8.5 metres (28 ft)
- Diameter: 4.2 metres (14 ft)
- Speed: 5 knots (9.3 km/h; 5.8 mph) cruise, 18 knots (33 km/h; 21 mph) max
- Endurance 6,500 kilometres; 4,000 miles (3,500 NM) on diesel power 139 kilometres; 86 miles (75 NM) on batteries
- Propulsion power: 1.5 megawatts (2,000 hp)
- Power generation: 2x diesel generator with Lithium-ion battery storage and optional air independent propulsion system
- Crew: 22 + 8 additional space for special forces personnel

Weapons include up to eight "modern heavy-weight torpedoes or guided missiles, delivered via four torpedo tubes. Torpedoes can be fired simultaneously. The submarine will be able to carry and launch underwater drones.

== See also ==
- Reis-class submarine
- MILDEN project
