= Hedley Kett =

Captain Hedley Kett DSC*
- Born: 28 July 1913; Ponders End, Lea Valley, London
- Died: 28 June 2014 (aged 100)
- Military career
- Allegiance: United Kingdom
- Branch: Royal Navy
- Rank: Captain
- Nickname: Tanker
- Commands: HMS P555; HMS Ultimatum; HMS Otway, HMS Taku (N38), HMS Tactician (P314), HMS Springer (P264)
- Conflicts: Second World War
- Awards: Distinguished Service Cross and Bar

William Hedley Kett, DSC and Bar (28 July 1913 – 28 June 2014) was a British submariner who commanded two ships during the Second World War.

== Early life ==
Kett was born at Ponders End, Lea Valley, London on 28 July 1913. He was a descendant of Robert Kett, who had led Kett's Rebellion in 1549. Brought up and educated at Blackheath, Hedley Kett first went to sea as a deck apprentice with the Bolton Steamship Company, and was later with the Glover Brothers company. His ship, the tanker Romney, was requisitioned by the Admiralty during the Spanish Civil War, making Kett part of the Royal Fleet Auxiliary, and in 1938 he joined the Royal Naval Reserve. He was second officer of RFA Arndale at the outbreak of the Second World War, and became her gunnery officer. He returned to Britain, and was called up for service in November 1939. Volunteering to serve on submarines, he joined the Odin-class submarine HMS Oberon as her navigator. He joined HMS Clyde in August 1940, at first as her navigator, later as her first lieutenant.

Clyde was involved in an action in Tarrafal Bay on 21 September 1941, after having been ordered to ambush U-boats that were meeting there to refuel and resupply. Kett was officer of the watch during the attack, and after attempting to torpedo U-68, Kett dived to reload, and collided with U-111. He then attempted to ram U-67. U-111 sustained heavy damage in the collision, was unable to dive, and was sunk on 4 October by HMT Lady Shirley. U-67 was also badly damaged, and forced to abandon her patrol and return to France. Clyde was then used for 'Magic Carpet' runs, transporting fuel and supplies from Gibraltar to Malta, with Kett overseeing the loading and unloading of the submarine, gaining the nickname 'Tanker'. Clyde would submerge in the harbour by day and unload the goods at night. After carrying out five supply runs, Kett flew back to Britain aboard a Vickers Wellington and attended the course for submarine captains. He married Doris May Mitchell during the brief time between his arrival in Britain, and the start of the course. He also received the Distinguished Service Cross at about this time for his work. Of the eighteen captains on Kett's course, only two survived the war, one was Kett, the other was John Roxburgh, later an admiral.

== Command ==
Graduating from the course, Kett was given command of HMS P555, assigned as a dummy target off Tobermory for surface ships practising anti-submarine tactics. In January 1943 he took command of HMS Ultimatum, spending the next two years as her commander, and carrying out twelve patrols in her. He attacked a U-boat while off Toulon on 30 October 1943, and was credited, erroneously, with sinking U-431. He received a bar to his DSC. One of Kett's last services in the Mediterranean was to use Ultimatum's sonar to plot the location of enemy mines of the southern French coast prior to Operation Dragoon. Kett also commanded HMS Otway, HMS Taku (N38), HMS Tactician (P314), and HMS Springer (P264).

== Post war ==
Kett left the navy in 1946, and went on to receive his licence as a London and North Sea pilot. He remained active in the Royal Naval Reserve, and in 1950 commanded HMS Springer for a fortnight during his annual training. He was appointed an aide-de-camp to Elizabeth II in 1966, and one of the Younger Brethren of Trinity House in 1971. He became a painter of landscapes and seascapes in his retirement. He died, at the age of 100, on 28 June 2014 and is survived by two daughters, Susie and Anna.
