= Argo-class submarine =

- Argo-class submarine (Argo)

Class overview
- Builders: Cantieri Riuniti dell'Adriatico, Monfalcone
- Operators: Regia Marina
- Built: 1936
- In commission: 1937–1943
- Completed: 2
- Lost: 1
- Scrapped: 1

General characteristics
- Type: Submarine
- Displacement: 793 t (780 long tons) (surfaced); 1,016 t (1,000 long tons) (submerged)
- Length: 63.15 m (207 ft 2 in)
- Beam: 6.93 m (22 ft 9 in)
- Draft: 4.46 m (14 ft 8 in)
- Installed power: 1,500 bhp (1,100 kW) (diesels); 800 hp (600 kW) (electric motors)
- Propulsion: 2 shafts; diesel-electric; 2 × diesel engines; 2 × electric motors
- Speed: 14 knots (26 km/h; 16 mph) (surfaced); 8 knots (15 km/h; 9.2 mph) (submerged)
- Range: 10,176 nmi (18,846 km; 11,710 mi) at 8.5 knots (15.7 km/h; 9.8 mph) (surfaced); 100 nmi (190 km; 120 mi) at 3 knots (5.6 km/h; 3.5 mph) (submerged)
- Test depth: 90 m (300 ft)
- Armament: 1 × single 100 mm (3.9 in) deck gun; 4 × single 13.2 mm (0.52 in) machine guns; 6 × 533 mm (21 in) torpedo tubes (4 bow, 2 stern)

The Argo-class was a class of two coastal submarines built by Cantieri Riuniti dell'Adriatico in Monfalcone for Portugal but operated by the Royal Italian Navy (Italian: Regia Marina) after Portugal was unable to pay construction costs. The submarines were built in 1936, and both served in the Mediterranean Sea at the start of the Second World War. The boats were transferred to the BETASOM Atlantic submarine base at Bordeaux in 1940, but returned to the Mediterranean in 1941, where both were sunk within a few days of the September 1943 Italian armistice.

== Design and description ==
The Argo-class submarines displaced 793 metric tons (780 long tons) surfaced and 1,016 metric tons (1,000 long tons) submerged. The submarines were 63.15 meters (207 ft 2 in) long, had a beam of 6.93 meters (22 ft 9 in) and a draft of 4.46 meters (14 ft 8 in). Their crew numbered 46 officers and enlisted men.

For surface running, the boats were powered by two 750-brake-horsepower (559 kW) diesel engines, each driving one propeller shaft. When submerged each propeller was driven by a 400-horsepower (298 kW) electric motor. They could reach 14 knots (26 km/h; 16 mph) on the surface and 8 knots (15 km/h; 9.2 mph) underwater. On the surface, the Argo class had a range of 10,176 nautical miles (18,846 km; 11,710 mi) at 8 knots (15 km/h; 9.2 mph); submerged, they had a range of 100 nmi (190 km; 120 mi) at 3 knots (5.6 km/h; 3.5 mph).

The boats were armed with six internal 53.3-centimeter (21 in) torpedo tubes, four in the bow and two in the stern for which they carried a total of 10 torpedoes. They were also armed with a single 100-millimeter (3.9 in) deck gun, forward of the conning tower, for combat on the surface. The light anti-aircraft armament consisted of four single 13.2-millimeter (0.52 in) machine guns.

== Ships ==
=== Argo ===
Argo (pennant number AO) was launched 24 November 1936 and completed on 31 August 1937. Argo completed two unsuccessful wartime patrols in the Mediterranean before passing the Strait of Gibraltar on 8 October 1940 for an Atlantic patrol to Bordeaux on 24 October. During its first BETASOM patrol, Argo damaged convoy HG 47 escort HMCS Saguenay on 1 December and sank a freighter from convoy OB 252 on 5 December 1940. First Lieutenant Alessandro De Angelis was lost overboard and drowned in heavy seas as Argo was returning to port. The second and third BETASOM patrols from 27 February to 28 March and from 19 May to 12 June 1941 were unsuccessful. Argo left France on 11 October, passed the Strait of Gibraltar on 20 October, and reached Cagliari on 24 October 1941. After refit, Argo patrolled off Cape Ferrat from 6 to 21 April and off Cap Caxime (Algeria) from 22 to 29 May 1942, where it sustained damage from aerial attacks requiring another period of repairs. After patrolling off the Balearic Islands from the 15 to 26 October and off the island of Galite (Tunisia) from the 29 to 30 October, Argo entered the Bay of Bougie on 11 November 1942 to torpedo the anti-aircraft ship HMS Tynwald and the troopship Awatea, which had been damaged by aerial bombing during Operation Torch. Argo then patrolled off the North African coast from 17 December to 8 January 1943, and during February, April and June. After two patrols off Sicily in July, Argo was refitting at Monfalcone until the armistice of September 8, 1943. Argo was scuttled when German troops captured the shipyard on 10 September. The Germans salvaged her, but scuttled her at Monfalcone, Friuli-Venezia Giulia, Italy, on 1 May 1945.

Ships sunk by Argo
Ship	Flag	Patrol	Date	Tonnage (GRT)	Notes
Silverpine	(United Kingdom)	4th	5 December 1940	5,066	Freighter from convoy OB 252; 19 survivors from a crew of 55
Tynwald	(United Kingdom)	12th	11 November 1942	2,376	Auxiliary anti-aircraft ship
Awatea	(United Kingdom)	12th	11 November 1942	13,482	Troopship
Total:				20,924 GRT	

=== Velella ===
Velella (pennant number VL) was launched 18 December 1936 and completed on 1 September 1937. Velella was on patrol in the eastern Mediterranean when Italy declared war. After refit at La Spezia, Velella sailed on 25 November 1940 and passed the Strait of Gibraltar on 1 December for an Atlantic patrol to Bordeaux on 25 December. After four unsuccessful Atlantic patrols, Valella returned to the Mediterranean on 24 August 1941. After refit at Cagliari and training at Pula, Velella patrolled without success south of Cape Palos (Spain) in April 1942, south of the Balearic Islands in June, along the Tunisian coast in July, and west of the Island of Galite in August, south of the Balearic Islands in September, in the Gulf of Philippeville and the Bay of Bona in November, north of Cape de Fer in April 1943, and off eastern Sicily in July. Its last patrol was off Salerno, where it was torpedoed by HMS Shakespeare on 7 September 1943. There were no survivors.

== See also ==
- Italian submarines of World War II
