= HMS Triumph (N18) =

T-class submarine of the British Royal Navy

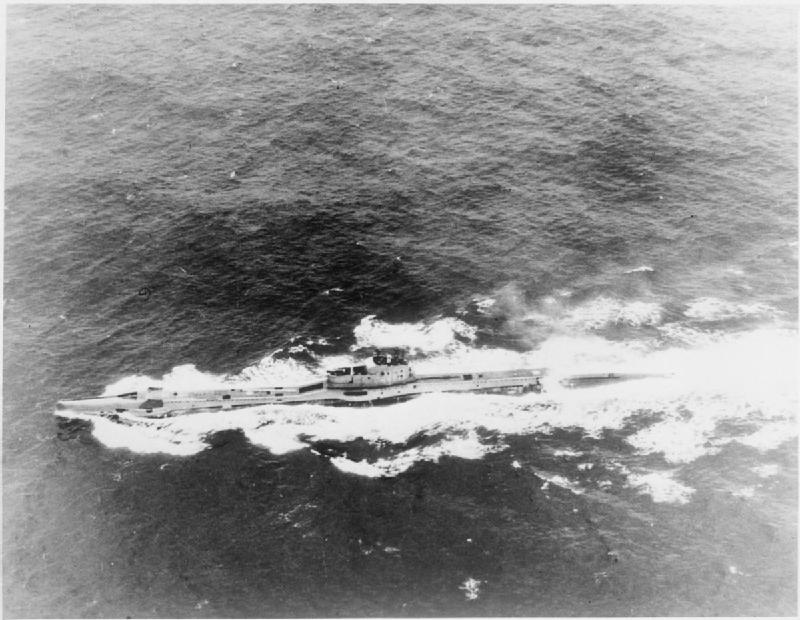
- HMS Triumph

History

United Kingdom
- Name: Triumph
- Builder: Vickers Armstrong, Barrow
- Laid down: 19 March 1937
- Launched: 16 February 1938
- Commissioned: 2 May 1939
- Identification: Pennant number N18
- Fate: Sank December 1941–January 1942
- Badge

General characteristics
- Class & type: British T class submarine
- Displacement: 1,090 tons surfaced; 1,575 tons submerged
- Length: 275 ft (84 m)
- Beam: 26 ft 6 in (8.08 m)
- Draught: 16.3 ft (5.0 m)
- Propulsion: Two shafts; Twin diesel engines 2,500 hp (1.86 MW) each; Twin electric motors 1,450 hp (1.08 MW) each
- Speed: 15.25 knots (28.7 km/h) surfaced; 9 knots (16.6 km/h) submerged
- Range: 4,500 nautical miles at 11 knots (8,330 km at 20 km/h) surfaced
- Test depth: 300 ft (91 m) max
- Complement: 64
- Armament: 6 internal forward-facing 21-inch (533 mm) torpedo tubes; 4 external forward-facing torpedo tubes; 6 reload torpedoes; 1 x 4-inch (102 mm) deck gun

HMS Triumph (N18) was a T-class submarine of the Royal Navy. She was laid down by Vickers at Barrow-in-Furness and launched in 1938. The boat was lost in transit in 1942, with a crew of 64, and its fate was unknown until the sunken boat was rediscovered in June 2023.

== Career ==
At the onset of the Second World War, Triumph was a member of the 2nd Submarine Flotilla. From 26–29 August 1939, the flotilla deployed to its war bases at Dundee and Blyth.

=== Home waters ===
HMS Triumph's bow displaying mine damage from December 1939

On 26 December 1939, Triumph hit a German mine in the North Sea. She lost 18 feet (5.5 m) of her bow when it was blown off. Her pressure hull was also damaged, but her torpedoes did not detonate. She managed to limp home under the protection of fighter aircraft and destroyers, and was under repair at Chatham Dockyard until 27 September 1940.

=== Mediterranean ===
Operating in the Mediterranean from early 1941, Triumph sank the Italian merchants Marzamemi, Colomba Lofaro, Ninfea, Monrosa, the Italian auxiliary patrol vessels V 136 / Tugnin F, Valoroso, V 190 / Frieda and V 137 / Trio Frassinetti, the Italian tug Dante de Lutti and salvage vessel Hercules, the German merchant Luvsee, and the Greek sailing vessels Panagiotis and Aghia Paraskevi. She also damaged the Italian armed merchant cruiser Ramb III, the Italian tankers Ardor and Poseidone, the Italian merchant Sidamo and the German merchant Norburg

In June 1941 she sank the Italian submarine Salpa near northern Egypt.

== Sinking and discovery ==
Triumph was also used for covert operations, such as landing agents in German-occupied areas. She was planned to be used as a rendezvous for commandos in Operation Colossus, but this had to be cancelled when the landing site became untenable. She undertook one such mission in December 1941, in which she successfully landed agents at Antiparos, Greece on the 30th. She failed to pick up the agents as scheduled on 9 January, and was lost probably to a collision with a mine. All sixty-four crew were lost. A memorial plaque to the boat and her lost crew members was placed in All Saints' Church, Lindfield, West Sussex.

In June 2023 Greek researchers led by Kostas Thoktaridis discovered the lost submarine in the Aegean Sea at a depth of 203 metres. The submarine rests on the seabed of the open sea with an 8-degree starboard list, dozens of kilometres away from the shores of Sounion. The lowered periscopes and sealed hatches testify that the Triumph was in a deep dive during its final moments. The diving planes and rudder are in a straight position, indicating that it was at a steady depth.
