= MS Augustus (1950) =

Ocean liner

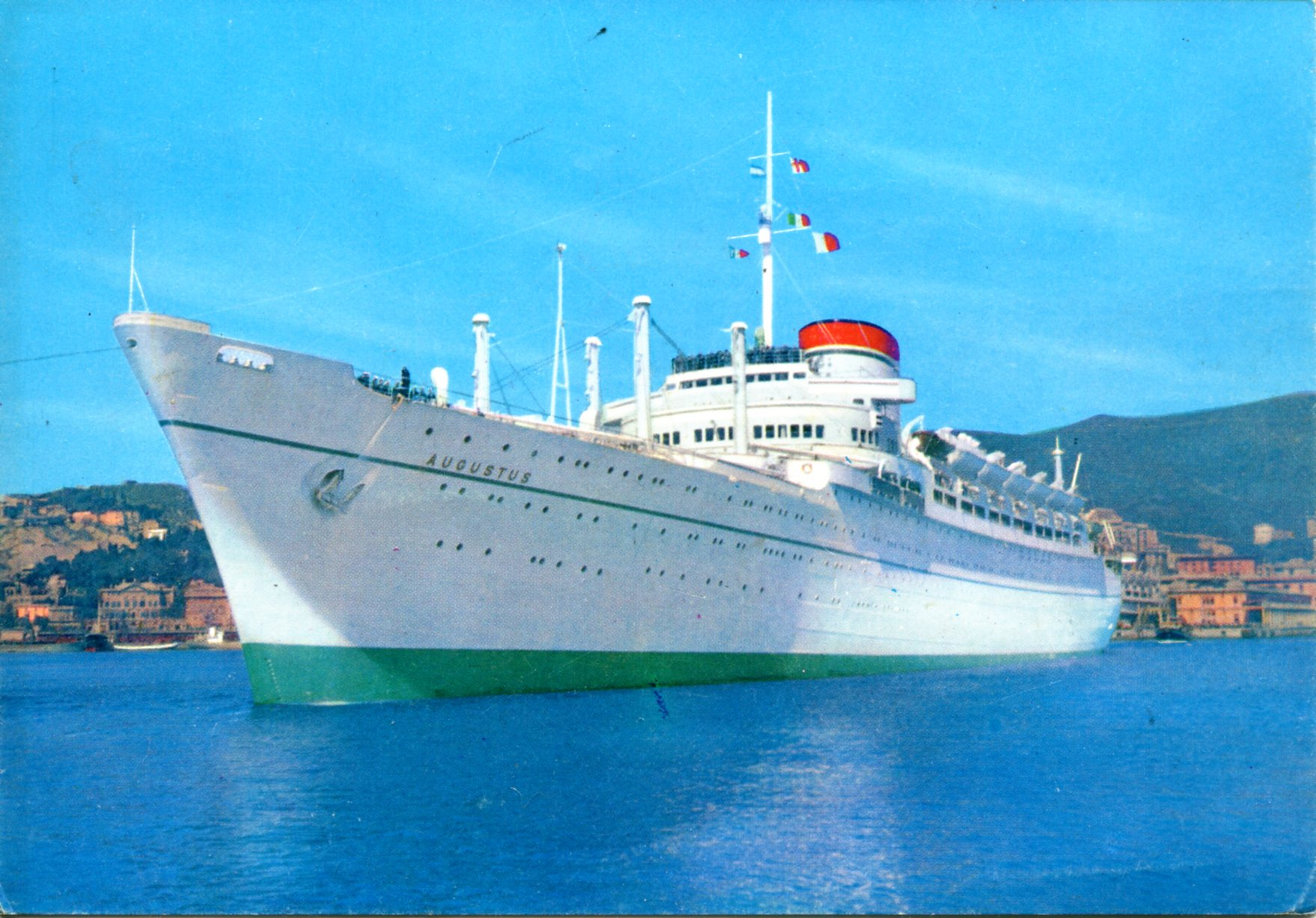
- Postcard of the MS Augustus

History
- Name: 1952–1976: Augustus; 1976–1980: Great Sea; 1980–1983: Ocean King; 1983–1985: Philippines; 1985–1987: President; 1987–1999: Asian Princess; 1999–2011: M/S Philippines, 2011-2012 Philippine.
- Namesake: Emperor Augustus (original name)
- Owner: 1952–1976: Italian Line; 1976–1999: Various Hong Kong-based companies; 1999–2011: Manila Hotel 2011–2012 Alang India ship scrappers.
- Port of registry: 1952–1976: Genoa, Italy; 1976–197?: Unknown, Seychelles; 197?–1980: Unknown, Panama; 1980 onwards?: Unknown, Philippines
- Builder: Cantieri Riuniti dell' Adriatico, Trieste, Italy
- Yard number: 1757
- Launched: 19 November 1950
- Maiden voyage: 4 March 1952, Genoa to South America via Naples and Gibraltar
- Out of service: 1987
- Identification: IMO number: 5030684
- Fate: Sold for scrap in 2012

General characteristics
- Type: 1952–1976: Passenger / cargo ocean liner; 1956–2000: Passenger ship; 2000 onwards: Onshore hotel
- Tonnage: 27,090 GRT
- Length: 207 m / 681 ft
- Beam: 26.6 m / 87.2 ft
- Draught: 8.5 m / 28 ft
- Installed power: Two 12-cylinder FIAT diesels developing 27,000 BHP
- Propulsion: twin screws
- Speed: Service speed: 21 knots; Top speed: 23.3 knots
- Capacity: Until 1964: First: 178, Cabin: 288, Tourist: 714; From 1964: First: 180, Tourist: Approx 1,000
- Crew: 493

MS Augustus was a 27,090 GRT, luxury ocean liner built in 1950 for Italian Line. She was the sister ship to MS Giulio Cesare that was launched in the same year. These two ships were built to the same design, with similar specifications. After the Augustus was sold to Hong Kong, she sailed under five names. The ship was later sold to Manila Hotel and renamed MS Philippines, functioning as a static hotel. As reported by both Maritimematters, and maritime, the MS Philippines was sold for scrap in September 2011. As of December 2011, she was beached in Alang for scrapping.

== Conception and construction ==
After the end of World War II, the Italian Line lost most of their fleet, they planned to build two 27,000 GRT ocean liners for post-war service to replace them. The Augustus' external beauty is restrained to canvassing standards with sculptured bridge wings, a nape at the aft funnel base, and even a trademark ventilator aft of the funnel that earned nicknamed the "robot" for its extraordinary shape. These two ships were one of the Italian postwar ships. The ship had twin 12-cylinder Fiat diesel engines, generating 24,000 brake horsepower (bhp) that drove her twin screws at a service speed of 21 knots. Both ships were designed to sail on the Italy-South America route, run with three classes. Both ships' interior were designed to have full air conditioning and swimming pools for each of three classes to make the ships looked like a luxurious hotel and to be the symbol of modern technology.

== Features ==
The Augustus had the following nine passenger decks (arrange from beneath the top of the house): Sun Deck, Lido Deck, Boat Deck, Promenade Deck, Upper Deck, Foyer Deck, A Deck, B Deck, and C Deck. Sun Deck, which started off from the wheelhouse, chartroom, radio room, following along either side of aft, encircling the funnel casing, kennels, and the "robot" ventilator, was first class's facility. Lido Deck started off from a narrow full-wrap around promenade and officers' quarters, culminating aft with a bar, the first class pool, and changing rooms.

Boat Deck started off forward with another narrow promenade, opening into wider expansion beneath a canopy of lifeboats and davits along either side. Inwardly, this level started off with the first class Belvedere Observation Lounge that was equipped with a panorama of windows overlooking the ship's bow.

A reading room was continuing aft on the starboard side. This space's amidships was the first class writing room. The forward staircase's highest level was just aft with its burled panels and magnificent modern glass railings. Also, there was an elevator, linking the first class decks in this part of the ship. The deluxe suite facility started along port and aft passageways, to a small gymnasium, playroom, solarium, and message room on the starboard side. The aft part of Boat Deck, which had its own pool, lido and bar, was cabin class's facility.

Promenade Deck started forward with a first class observation area, then number three-like encompassing, continuing aft through narrow links to the glass-enveloped first class promenade. Inwardly, it started with the phenomenal social hall with its curved panorama of windows and an aft bulkhead that held sculptures and reliefs in bronze by Mascherini. In this sheered salon, the ceiling accommodated an oval recess in which the lighting was designed in a zodiac fashion. This room was converted into an auditorium in 1964. The only part of this social hall to be carried over into the auditorium was an oval ceiling recess constellation-like lighting arrangement. Representative hall was decorated with huge tapestry of Zoran Music: The Travels of Marco Polo. Tapestry is preserved in MUCA museum in Monfalcone.

The forward staircase lobby continued aft with foyer starting off on either side to the passageways and promenades which brought aft to the first class ballroom. The staircase itself, was decorated with Mascherini's sculptures.

== Career ==
=== Italian Line service ===
The Augustus was launched on 19 November 1950, at the Cantieri Riuniti dell'Adriatico, San Marco shipyard near Trieste, by Francesca De Gasperi (the wife of the Italian Prime Minister Alcide De Gasperi). On 4 March 1952, she sailed from Genoa to South America on her maiden voyage. She was put in a normal route from Genoa, calling at Naples, Cannes, Barcelona (or Lisbon), Rio de Janeiro, Santos and Montevideo, to Buenos Aires. Following the loss of the SS Andrea Doria in 1956, she was put into the North Atlantic service in February 1957 before returning to her usual Genoa-South America route in 1960 after the new SS Leonardo da Vinci was in service on the North Atlantic route. She and her sister were converted to two classes, which the cabin class was removed. Like her sister, the ship was given a refit; however, these two ships were given a similar addition, which made them still look the same as each other.

=== Hong Kong and Philippine service ===
The Augustus was retired from service in January 1976. On 15 January 1976, she was laid up in Naples. She was sold to Hong Kong and was renamed Great Sea. After a little use, she was renamed Ocean King in 1980. And in 1983, she was renamed Philippines. At that time, she served as an accommodation ship in Manila. She was renamed President in 1985. However, she was laid up in Kaohsiung, and in 1987, she was renamed Asian Princess and in 1997, she was moved to Subic Bay, where she was converted into cruising. However, the ship has failed in making money in this venture. Then she was moved and place at anchorage off Manila. She was dry-docked at Subic Bay in mid-1998, and in February 1999, she returned to Manila, where she was refitted for use as a floating hotel and restaurant venue as originally planned.

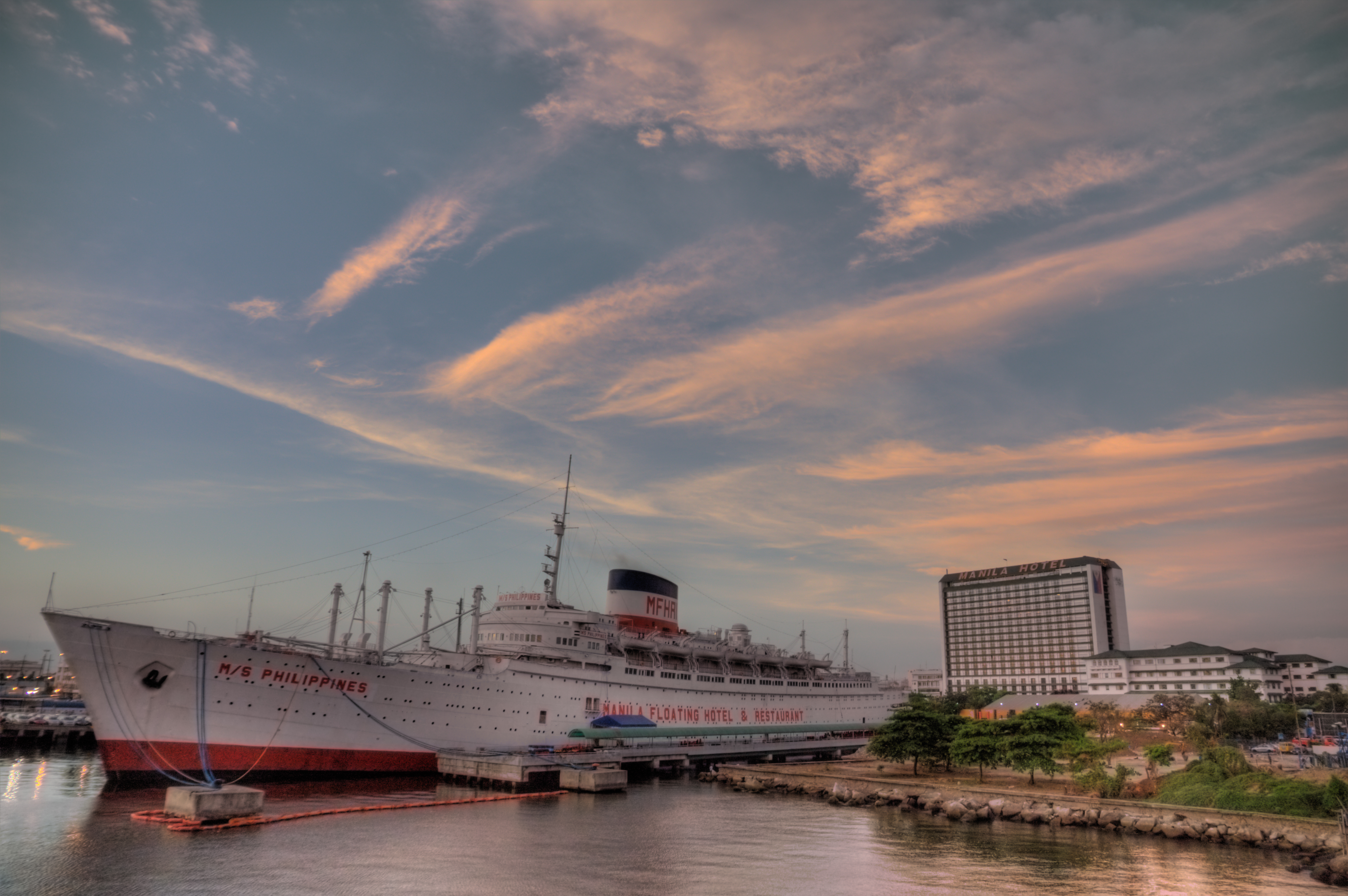
The MS Philippines laid up in Manila as a floating hotel and restaurant

The ship was berthed at Pier 15 South Harbour Manila on 2 October 1999, after she was acquired by the Manila Hotel. On 12 October 1999 in a gala ceremony attended by President Estrada, the ship was renamed MS Philippines. She was opened to the public, and in early 2000, the ship was opened as a hotel but due to the political disruption, the hotel was eventually closed. Shortly after, she was reopened for an onshore hotel. However, she was laid up for sale; Italian buyers expressed interest in purchasing her but no sale was ever closed, and the vessel was sold for scrapping. During the months of January 2012 through October 2012, the Philippines was cut up by scrappers in Alang, India, and now there is nothing left recognizable of the former Augustus.
