= Argonauta-class submarine =

Spanish historical submarine

- Argonauta

Class overview
- Name: Argonauta class
- Builders: CRDA; OTO; Tosi
- Operators: Regia Marina
- Preceded by: Argo class
- Succeeded by: Sirena class
- Built: 1929–1933
- In commission: 1932–1948
- Completed: 7
- Lost: 6
- Scrapped: 1

General characteristics
- Type: Submarine
- Displacement: 660 t (650 long tons) (surfaced); 813 t (800 long tons) (submerged)
- Length: 61.5 m (202 ft)
- Beam: 5.7 m (18 ft 8 in)
- Draft: 4.7 m (15 ft 5 in)
- Installed power: 1,500 bhp (1,100 kW) (diesels); 800 hp (600 kW) (electric motors)
- Propulsion: 2 shafts; diesel-electric; 2 × diesel engines; 2 × electric motors
- Speed: 14 knots (26 km/h; 16 mph) (surfaced); 8 knots (15 km/h; 9.2 mph) (submerged)
- Range: 5,000 nmi (9,300 km; 5,800 mi) at 8 knots (15 km/h; 9.2 mph) (surfaced); 110 nmi (200 km; 130 mi) at 3 knots (5.6 km/h; 3.5 mph) (submerged)
- Test depth: 80 m (260 ft)
- Armament: 1 × single 102 mm (4 in) deck gun; 2 × single 13.2 mm (0.52 in) machine guns; 6 × 533 mm (21 in) torpedo tubes (4 bow, 2 stern)

The Argonauta-class submarine was the first sub-class of the 600 Series of coastal submarines built for the Regia Marina (Royal Italian Navy) during the 1930s. Some of these boats played a minor role in the Spanish Civil War of 1936–1939 supporting the Spanish Nationalists. Of the seven boats built in this class, only a single one survived the Second World War.

== Design and description ==
The Argonauta class was derived from the earlier Squalo-class submarines. They displaced 660 metric tons (650 long tons) surfaced and 813 metric tons (800 long tons) submerged. The submarines were 61.5 meters (201 ft 9 in) long, had a beam of 5.7 meters (18 ft 8 in) and a draft of 4.7 meters (15 ft 5 in). They had an operational diving depth of 80 meters (260 ft). Their crew numbered 44 officers and enlisted men.

For surface running, the boats were powered by two 750-brake-horsepower (559 kW) diesel engines, each driving one propeller shaft. When submerged each propeller was driven by a 400-horsepower (298 kW) electric motor. They could reach 14 knots (26 km/h; 16 mph) on the surface and 8 knots (15 km/h; 9.2 mph) underwater. On the surface, the Settembrini class had a range of 5,000 nautical miles (9,300 km; 5,800 mi) at 8 knots (15 km/h; 9.2 mph); submerged, they had a range of 110 nmi (200 km; 130 mi) at 3 knots (5.6 km/h; 3.5 mph).

The boats were armed with six 53.3-centimeter (21 in) torpedo tubes, four in the bow and two in the stern for which they carried a total of 12 torpedoes. They were also armed with a single 102-millimeter (4 in) deck gun forward of the conning tower for combat on the surface. Their anti-aircraft armament consisted of two single 13.2-millimeter (0.52 in) machine guns.

== Ships ==
Construction details
Ship	Builder	Laid down	Launched	Commissioned	Fate
Argonauta	Cantieri Riuniti dell'Adriatico, Monfalcone	9 November 1929	19 January 1931	1 January 1932	Sunk by British aircraft 28 June 1940
Fisalia	Cantieri Riuniti dell'Adriatico, Monfalcone	20 November 1929	2 May 1931	5 June 1932	Sunk by HMS Hyacinth 28 September 1941
Jalea	Odero Terni Orlando, Muggiano	20 January 1930	15 June 1932	16 March 1933	Discarded 1 February 1948
Jantina	Odero Terni Orlando, Muggiano	20 January 1930	16 May 1932	1 March 1933	Sunk by HMS Torbay 5 July 1941
Medusa	Cantieri Riuniti dell'Adriatico, Monfalcone	30 November 1929	10 December 1931	25 September 1932	Sunk by HMS Thorn 30 January 1942
Salpa	Cantieri navali Tosi di Taranto, Taranto	23 April 1930	8 May 1932	12 December 1932	Sunk by HMS Triumph 27 June 1941
Serpente	Cantieri navali Tosi di Taranto, Taranto	23 April 1930	28 February 1932	12 November 1932	Scuttled at Ancona 12 September 1943

== Service ==
The seven Argonauta-class submarines saw action during the Second World War. Five were sunk in action during the conflict and a sixth was scuttled at the Italian armistice in 1943. The last surviving boat of the class was stricken in 1948.
