= Italian 600 Series submarines =

Italian submarine type

Class overview
- Name: 600 Series
- Operators: Regia Marina
- Subclasses: Argonauta class; Sirena class; Perla class; Adua class; Acciaio class
- Built: 1932–1941
- In commission: 1933–1942
- Completed: 59
- Lost: 48
- Retired: 11

General characteristics
- Type: Submarine
- Displacement: 650–715 tonnes (640–704 long tons) surfaced; 810–870 tonnes (800–860 long tons) submerged
- Length: 61.5–60.18 m (201.8–197.4 ft)
- Beam: 5.65–6.44 m (18.5–21.1 ft)
- Draught: 4.64–4.78 m (15.2–15.7 ft)
- Propulsion: 2 diesel 1,500–1,400 hp (1–1 MW); 2 electric 800–800 hp (1–1 MW)
- Speed: 14–14 knots (26–26 km/h; 16–16 mph)surfaced; 8–7.3 knots (14.8–13.5 km/h; 9.2–8.4 mph)submerged
- Range: 2,300ml surfaced; 110-80 ml submerged
- Complement: 44–48
- Armament: 6× 533 mm (21 in) Torpedo tube; 1 × 100 mm (4 in) gun; 2-4 13.2 mm (1 in) MG

The Italian 600 Series submarines were a series of submarine classes built for the Italian Royal Navy (Regia Marina) during the Inter war years.

== Development ==
The 600 Series were sea-going submarines, though designated as coastal-type submarines, built for service in the Mediterranean. They were built to conform to the interwar naval treaties arising from the 1922 Washington and 1930 London conferences, which placed restrictions on the number and size of warships of various types that nations could build. The coastal submarine was limited to a 600-ton surface displacement, though there was no limit placed on the numbers of these vessels that could be built.

During this period Italy was involved in a rivalry with France in the Mediterranean, leading to a naval arms race. This provided the impetus for a sustained building programme, and led to Italy having the second largest submarine fleet in the world by outbreak of World War II.

The Italian 600 series was equivalent to the French 600 Series, the British S class, and the German Type VII U-boat.

The first submarines of the Argentine Navy, the Santa Fe class, derived from these Italian ships.

== General characteristics ==
The 600s had a surface displacement just above 600 tons; the earliest vessels displaced 650 tons while the last built were 715 tons. They had an endurance of 2,300 miles at 14 knots, with a submerged speed of 7-8 knots. Their armament was six torpedo tubes (4 forward, 2 aft) with an outfit of 10-12 torpedoes and a single 3.9 inch/100 mm (4 in) gun, and four 13.2 mm (0.52 in) machine guns. They were manned by crews of 44 –48 men.

== Construction history ==
The prototype for the 600s was the Argonauta class, a class of seven single –hulled submarines of a Bernardis design, built in 1929. A further four classes were orders over the next 13 years, eventually totalling 59 submarines completed.

- Argonauta class: a class of seven submarines, ordered in 1929 and completed in 1932–33. These all saw service in the Second World War, and six were lost.
- Sirena class: a class of 12 submarines, ordered in 1931 and completed in 1933–34. These all saw service in the Second World War, and 11 were lost.
- Perla class: a class of 10 submarines ordered in 1935 and completed in 1936. These all saw service in the Second World War, and seven were lost.
- Adua class: a class of 17 submarines ordered in 1936 and completed in 1937–38. These all saw service in the Second World War, and 13 were lost.
- Acciaio class: a class of 13 submarines ordered in 1940 and completed in 1942. These all saw service in the Second World War, and 11 were lost.

Overall, despite their heavy losses, the 600s proved to be successful boats. They showed good manoeuvrability, their hull was well designed and strongly built to withstand depth pressure and explosions that exceeded their test values. While smaller than contemporary ocean-going submarines, such as the Settembrini class, the 600s were cheaper to build, so that more could be built for the same expenditure. The 600s were not markedly inferior in striking power; six torpedo tubes compared to the Settembrini's eight, though they carried the same number of torpedoes (twelve): Nor in speed; 14 knots on the surface, and 7.7 submerged, compare to the Settembrini's 17 and 8 knots respectively. The 600s' range was less (5000 nautical miles, compared to the Settembrini's 9000), but adequate for operations in the closer waters of the Mediterranean. The success of the 600 Series led to the development of the Flutto class, a wartime design suited for fast production.

== War service ==
The 600 Series submarines served with the Regia Marina during World War II in a full range of front-line duties and missions. During the conflict between 1940 and 1943, 48 of the 59 built (80%) were lost.
