= Cantieri Riuniti dell'Adriatico =

Italian ship manufacturer

Cantieri Riuniti dell'Adriatico (C.R.D.A)
- Company type: Defunct (merged 1966)
- Industry: Naval and commercial shipbuilding
- Founded: 1930
- Defunct: 1984
- Fate: Absorbed into the Fincantieri Group
- Headquarters: Trieste, Monfalcone, (Italy)
- Services: Ship repair

Cantieri Riuniti dell'Adriatico ("United Shipbuilders of the Adriatic") was an Italian manufacturer in the sea and air industry which was active from 1930 to 1966. This shipyard is now owned by Fincantieri.

== History ==
In 1930, Stabilimento Tecnico Triestino based at Trieste merged with another Italian company, the Cantiere Navale Triestino of Monfalcone, forming the Cantieri Riuniti dell'Adriatico (CRDA). The new company built a number of light and heavy cruisers for the Regia Marina (Royal Italian Navy) between the wars, as well as some 27 submarines. It also built, in 1932, the ocean liner Conte di Savoia, the first major liner fitted with gyroscopic stabilizers.

During World War II, CRDA Trieste built two battleships for the Regia Marina, Vittorio Veneto and Roma. CRDA survived the postwar shakeup in the shipbuilding industry and went on to build several more commercial liners in the 1950s and 1960s, as well as a few naval vessels. In 1984, CRDA was sold to the Fincantieri Group.

For the Olympic regattas of 1960 the firm produced 55 Finn sailboats for the single-handed event in the Gulf of Naples.

== Ships built ==
The following table lists ships built at the former STT shipyards after the company's 1929 merger with Cantieri Navale Triestino to form CRDA.

Production
Ship	Type	Class	Built	Disp.	Notes
J.A. Mowinckel	Motor tanker		1930	11,147	Damaged by torpedo from U-576, 1942; repaired, 1943; scrapped at Blyth, 1954
Various	Submarines	N/A	1931–40	N/A	27 submarines
Fiume	Cruiser	Zara	1931	14,530	Sunk during Battle of Cape Matapan on 29 March 1941
Luigi Cadorna	Lt. cruiser	Condottieri	1931	7,113	Scrapped, 1951
Conte di Savoia	Ocean liner	N/A	1932	48,502	Scuttled in 1943. later raised and Scrapped in 1950
Muzio Attendolo	Light cruiser	Montecuccoli	1935	8,994	Sunk by bombing, 1942
Giuseppe Garibaldi	Light cruiser	Duca degli Abruzzi	1937	11,735	Converted to guided missile cruiser, 1957, scrapped 1972
Edwy R. Brown	Motor tanker		1938	10,455	Sunk by torpedo from U-103, 1941
Pedernales	Motor tanker		1938	4,317	Scrapped at Rotterdam, 1959
Dona Nati	Cargo		1939	8,560	For the De la Rama S.S. Co. Inc., Iloilo, Philippines
Dona Aurora	Cargo		1939	8,560	For the De la Rama S.S. Co. Inc., Iloilo, Philippines
Dona Aniceti	Cargo		1939	8,560	For the De la Rama S.S. Co. Inc., Iloilo, Philippines
Vittorio Veneto	Battleship	Littorio	1940	45,752	Scrapped at La Spezia 1951–54
Roma	Battleship	Littorio	1942	45,752	Sunk by bombing, 1943
Donizetti	Ocean liner	N/A	1951	N/A	N/A
Artemide	Corvette	Gabbiano	1942	N/A	Captured 09/09/43 and renamed UJ 2226, scuttled 24/04/45
Rossini	Ocean liner	N/A	1951	N/A	N/A
Verdi	Ocean liner	N/A	1951	N/A	N/A
Augustus	Ocean liner	N/A	1952	27,090	Operated as floating hotel, then restaurant ship, MS Philippines, in 1999. Scrapped at Alang in 2011
Raffaello	Ocean liner	N/A	1965	45,933	Sold to Iran and converted as floating barracks, 1977, sunk by bombing in 1983
N/A	Frigate	N/A	1969	N/A	N/A
N/A	Submarine	N/A	1969	N/A	N/A
N/A	Corvette	N/A	1979	N/A	N/A

Reference: Winklareth p. 292-293

== See also ==
- Cantiere Navale Triestino
- Stabilimento Tecnico Triestino

== Bibliography ==
- Gardiner, Robert; Chesneau, Roger, eds. (1980). Conway's All the World's Fighting Ships 1922–1946. London: Conway Maritime Press. ISBN 0-85177-146-7.
