= Coastal submarine =

Type of submarine (naval vessel)

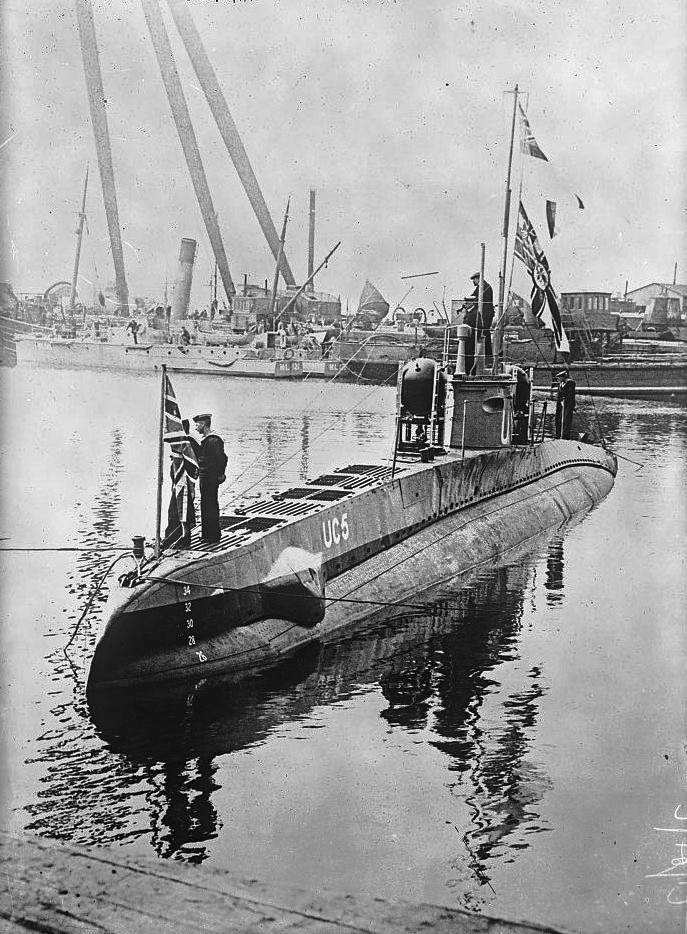
A minelaying German Type UC I submarine

A coastal submarine or littoral submarine is a small, maneuverable submarine with a shallow draft well suited to navigating coastal channels and harbors. Although size is not precisely defined, coastal submarines are larger than midget submarines, but smaller than sea-going submarines designed for longer patrols on the open ocean. Space limitations aboard coastal submarines restrict fuel availability for distant travel, food availability for extended patrol duration, and number of weapons carried. Within those limitations, however, coastal submarines may be able to reach areas inaccessible to larger submarines, and be more difficult to detect.

== History ==
The earliest submarines were effectively coastal submarines, but as modern submarine tactics developed during World War I, the advantages of rapid construction and portability encouraged the development of UB torpedo launching, and UC minelaying coastal submarines in 1915 to operate in the English Channel. These coastal submarines displaced only 15 to 20 percent of the weight of a contemporary conventional U-boat, could be built in one-quarter of the time it took to complete a conventional U-boat, and be delivered on railway wagons to operating bases in Belgium. Improved versions of UB and UC coastal submarines were devised. Total production of German coastal submarines during World War I was 136 type UB and 95 type UC.

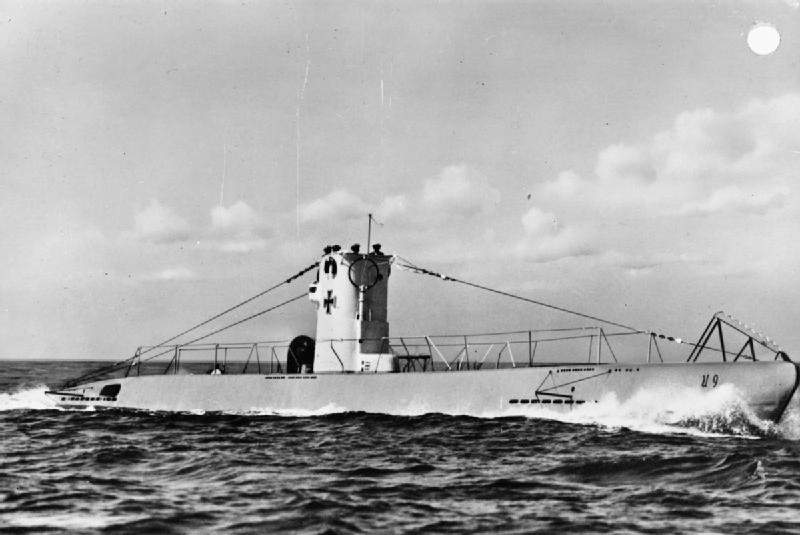
German Type II submarine U-9

German submarine construction between the World Wars began in 1935 with the building of 24 Type II coastal submarines. These coastal U-boats, with another eight completed prior to hostilities, made North Sea combat patrols during the early months of World War II and then served in the Baltic Sea training crews to operate ocean-going submarines. The 30th U-boat Flotilla of six Type II U-boats was transported overland via the Autobahn and then down the Danube for combat patrols in the Black Sea until September 1944.

== Examples ==
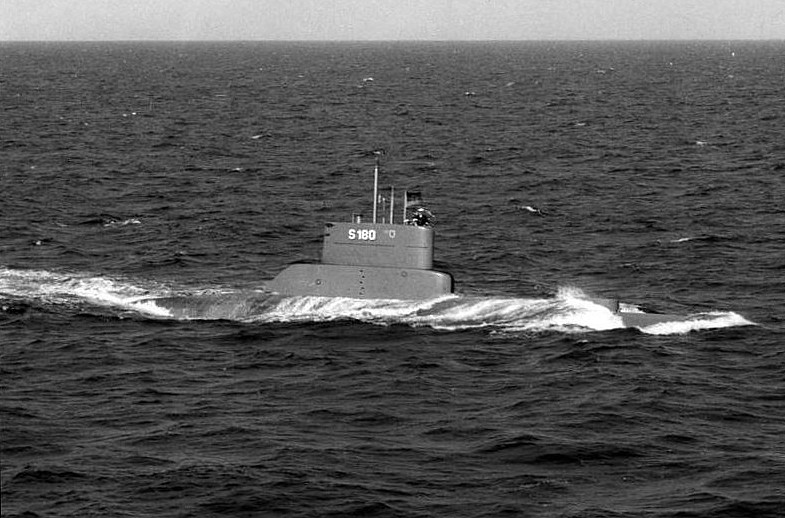
Type 205 submarine U-1

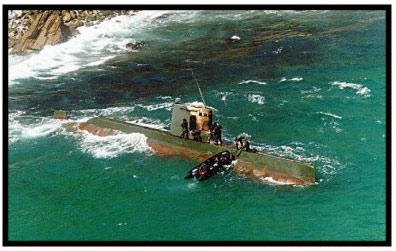
Sang-O-class submarine

- German Type UB I submarine
- German Type UB II submarine
- German Type UB III submarine
- German Type UC I submarine
- German Type UC II submarine
- German Type UC III submarine
- British H-class submarine
- German Type II submarine
- Mackerel-class submarine
- German Type XVII submarine
- Type XXIII submarine
- Ha-201-class submarine
- Type 201 submarine
- Type 205 submarine
- Type 206 submarine
- Sang-O-class submarine
- STM 500
- Gotland-class submarine
- Fateh-class submarine
- Andrasta-class submarine

== See also ==
- List of submarine operators
- List of submarine classes in service

== Sources ==
- Gray, Edwyn A. (1972). The Killing Time. New York: Charles Scribner's Sons.
- Lenton, H.T. (1976). German Warships of the Second World War. New York: Arco Publishing Company. ISBN 0-668-04037-8.
- Tarrant, V.E. (1989). The U-Boat Offensive 1914-1945. London: Cassell & Company. ISBN 1-85409-520-X.
