= Škoda 10 cm K10 =

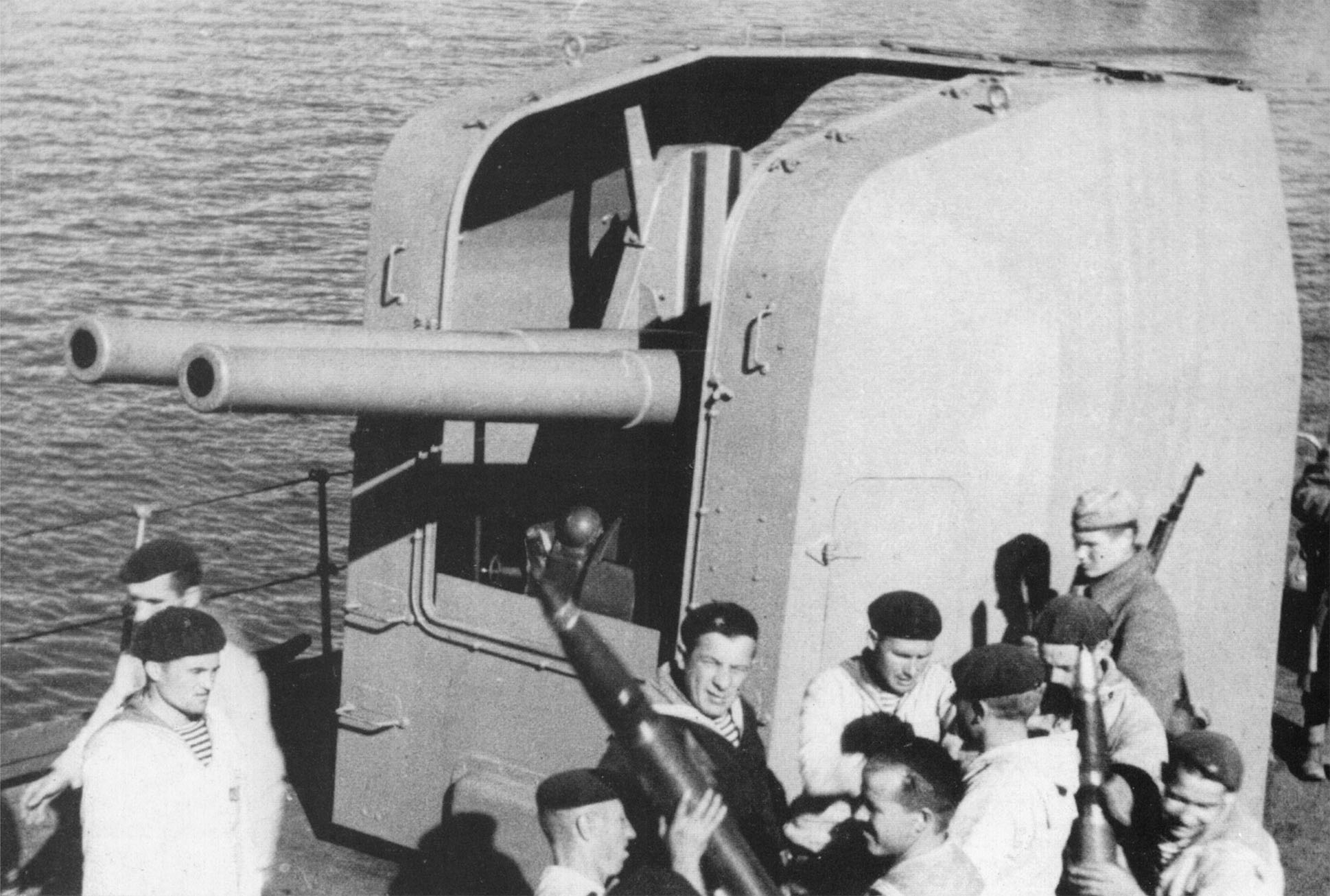
- A twin "Minizini" mount aboard the Soviet cruiser Krasnyi Kavkaz
- Type: Naval gun Dual-purpose gun Coastal artillery Anti-aircraft gun
- Place of origin: Austria-Hungary

Service history
- Used by: Austria-Hungary; Italy; France; Spain; Sweden; Soviet Union
- Wars: World War I Spanish Civil War; World War II

Production history
- Designer: Skoda
- Designed: 1907
- Manufacturer: Skoda
- Produced: 1910
- Variants: Škoda 10 cm K07; Škoda 10 cm K11; OTO 100/47

Specifications
- Mass: 2,020 kilograms (4,450 lb)
- Barrel length: 4.985 meters (16.35 ft) 50 caliber
- Shell: Fixed QF 100 x 892R
- Shell weight: 13.75 kilograms (30.3 lb)
- Caliber: 100 millimeters (3.9 in)
- Breech: Horizontal sliding breech block
- Elevation: Austria-Hungary: -4° to +18° Italian: -5° to +85° Russian: -5° to +78°
- Traverse: 360°
- Rate of fire: 8-10 rpm
- Muzzle velocity: 880 meters per second (2,900 ft/s)
- Maximum firing range: Austria-Hungary: 11 km (6.8 mi) at +14° Italian: 15.2 km (9.4 mi) at 45° AA Ceiling: 10 km (33,000 ft) at 80°

The Škoda 10 cm K10 was a 100 mm (3.9-inch) naval gun of the Austro-Hungarian Navy used as tertiary armament on semi-dreadnought battleships and as primary armament on scout cruisers and destroyers during World War I. After World War I, variants of the Škoda 10 cm K10 were widely produced in Italy as the 100/47 (Note: In Italian nomenclature the first number indicates the caliber expressed in millimeters, the second the length in calibers. This second value is not 50 calibers because the Italians calculated the length of the barrel excluding the firing chamber.) series of guns, which served in a number of roles, on a wide variety of ships, with a number of navies.

== History ==
The origins of the Škoda 10 cm K10 began with the earlier K07 developed in 1907 at the Škoda Works in Plzeň. When the gun was put into production in 1910 it was renamed the Škoda 10 cm K10 and entered service aboard the Radetzky-class battleships in 20 single mount casemates amidships. The K11 model soon followed the K10 into service aboard the cruiser SMS Admiral Spaun, the Novara-class cruisers and the Tátra-class destroyers of the Austro-Hungarian Navy in low-angle, single gun turrets. The main difference between the various models was their mounts, traverse and elevation. After World War I SMS Radetzky, SMS Erzherzog Franz Ferdinand and SMS Zrínyi were ceded to Italy and scrapped between 1920 and 1926. SMS Admiral Spaun was ceded to the British and sold to an Italian company for scrapping in 1922. The Novara and Tátra classes proved ideal for service in the Adriatic during the First World War and the surviving units were ceded as war reparations to Italy and France. SMS Helgoland (renamed Brindisi) and SMS Saida (renamed Venezia) served in the Italian Navy until scrapped in 1937, while SMS Novara (renamed Thionville) served in the French Navy until scrapped in 1942. Three of the Tátra-class destroyers, Triglav II, Lika II, and Uzsok, were ceded to Italy as the Fasana class and Dukla was ceded to France. These ships were little used and re-rated as torpedo boats in 1929, with the last ships being scrapped in 1936. In 1937 the salvaged 10 cm K10's were landed and assigned to coastal artillery. At the outbreak of World War II, 41 guns were still in service.

== Description ==
The Škoda 10 cm K10 was built with an A tube, jacket and a breech ring screwed to both the A tube and jacket. It had a horizontal sliding breech block and fired fixed (one part) ammunition.

== OTO 100/47 ==
The Italian Navy were impressed with the Škoda 10 cm K10s and in 1924 a copy of the gun was ordered from the Italian firm OTO Melara which spawned a large family of 100/47 cannons that were widely used. A number of different models were produced on different mountings for a variety of ship types.

- OTO Mod. 1924, Mod. 1927 and Mod. 1928 100/47 - These guns were virtual reproductions of the Škoda 10 cm K10, but with loose liners. The gun was built with A tube, jacket and loose liner with a breech ring that screwed to both the A tube and jacket. The breech block was a horizontal sliding type and it fired fixed ammunition. These AA guns were mounted in nearly all heavy and light cruisers of the Italian Navy during World War II. The most widely used model was the OTO Mod. 1928 gun in twin-gun Mod. 1928 mounts. These shielded twin mounts had both guns in a common cradle that allowed -5° to 85° elevation. The mounts had adjustable trunnions which were automatically raised by electric power as the guns elevated. They had mechanized spring and rope rammers. The speed of movement for the mount was found to be too slow to follow fast moving aerial targets, particularly if the ship was rolling and was more suited to barrage fire. This mounting was designed by Comandante Minisini of the Regia Marina and were often referred to as Minisinis. The Soviet Union bought 10 of the Mod. 1928 mounts for their Admiral Nakhimov-class cruisers and their crews referred to them as Minizinis.
- OTO Mod. 1931, Mod. 1935 and Mod. 1937 100/47 - These guns had the same construction details as the Mod. 1928. These guns were in single, usually shielded, hand-worked, Mod. 1931 or Mod. 1937 mounts. These dual-purpose mounts were common on Italian torpedo-boats of World War II. The Mod. 1931 mounts had an elevation of -6° to +45°, which was later increased to -9° / +60° for the Mod. 1937 mounts. These simpler hand-worked mounts were considered adequate for their role.
- OTO Mod. 1931, Mod. 1935 and Mod. 1938 100/47 for Submarines - Same construction details as the earlier Mod. 1928, except the barrel was shortened to 4.94 m (16 ft 2 in). These guns were used in single, hand-worked, unshielded, pedestal-mounts. These guns were mounted on the majority of Italian submarines, except for the Micca and Calvi classes.

== Naval service ==
Mounting	Gun model	Gun mount	Weight	Length	Elevation	Range	Ship class
Low-Angle Single Mount	Škoda 10 cm K10 & K11	Mod. 1910	2,020 kg	4.985 metres (16 ft 4.3 in)	-4° / +18°	16,885 m	Radetzky-class battleships, Novara-class cruisers, Tátra-class destroyers
AA Twin mount	OTO Mod. 1924	Mod. 1924	15,000 kg	4,985 mm	-5° / +85°	15,240 m	Trento-class cruisers
AA Twin mount	OTO Mod. 1927	Mod. 1927	15,000 kg	4,985 mm	-5° / +85°	15,240 m	Pola (cruiser)
AA Twin mount	OTO Mod. 1928	Mod. 1928	15,000 kg	4,985 mm	-5° / +85°	15,240 m	Admiral Nakhimov-class cruisers, Bolzano (cruiser), Condottieri-class cruisers, Conte di Cavour-class battleships, San Giorgio (cruiser), Zara-class cruisers
Dual-purpose single mount	OTO Mod. 1931	Mod. 1931	N/A	4,985 mm	-6° / +45°	15,400 m	Spica-class torpedo boats, of the Spica, Climene and Perseo groups
Dual-purpose single mount	OTO Mod. 1935	Mod. 1931	6,300 kg	4,985 mm	-9° / +60°	15,400 m	Little used, replaced by Mod. 1937 mount
Dual-purpose single mount	RM Mod. 1937	Mod. 1931	N/A	4,985 mm	-9° / +60°	15,400 m	Little used, replaced by Mod. 1937 mount
Dual-purpose single mount	OTO Mod. 1937	Mod. 1937	6,800 kg	4,985 mm	-9° / +60°	15,400 m	Ariete-class torpedo boats, Ciclone-class torpedo boats, Gabbiano-class corvettes, Orsa-class torpedo boats, Spica-class torpedo boats of the Alcyone group
Submarine deck gun	OTO Mod. 1931	Mod. 1938M	4,650 kg	4.940 m (16 ft 2.5 in)	-5° / +35°	12,600 m	Archimede-class submarines, Argo-class submarines, Glauco-class submarines
Submarine deck gun	OTO Mod. 1935	Mod. 1938M	4,650 kg	4.940 m (16 ft 2.5 in)	-5° / +35°	12,600 m	Adua-class submarines, Perla-class submarines
Submarine deck gun	OTO Mod. 1938	Mod. 1938M	4,650 kg	4.940 m (16 ft 2.5 in)	-5° / +35°	12,600 m	Acciaio-class submarines, Brin-class submarines, Cagni-class submarines, Flutto-class submarines, Foca-class submarines, Liuzzi-class submarines, Marcello-class submarines, Marconi-class submarines

== Ammunition ==
Ammunition was of Fixed QF type. The cartridge case was 1.2 m (3 ft 11 in) long and with a 6.6 kg (15 lb) propellant charge weighed 26 kg (57 lb).

The gun was able to fire:

- High Explosive - 13.75 kg (30.3 lb)
