= Breda Model 1931 machine gun =

Type of Italian heavy machine gun

Breda Model 31
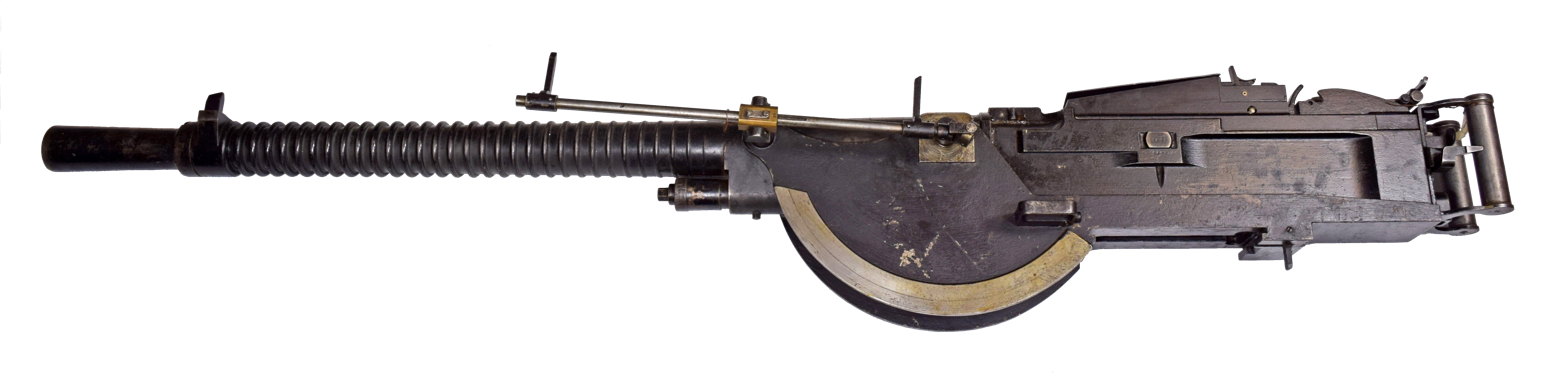
- Swedish 13.2 mm Breda model 1931 (13,2 mm ksp M/It)
- Type: Heavy machine gun Anti-aircraft gun
- Place of origin: France

Service history
- In service: 1931−1950
- Used by: Italy; Swedish navy
- Wars: World War II

Production history
- Designer: Hotchkiss
- Designed: 1929
- Manufacturer: Breda
- Produced: 1931

Specifications
- Mass: 47.5 kg (105 lb)
- Length: 1.65 m (5 ft 5 in)
- Barrel length: 1 m (3 ft 3 in) L/76
- Crew: 1
- Shell: 13.2×99mm Hotchkiss Long
- Shell weight: Cartridge weight: 112–120 g Shell weight: 42–51 g
- Caliber: 13.2 mm (0.52 in)
- Elevation: -6° to +85°
- Traverse: 360°
- Rate of fire: 400 rpm (cyclic); 200-250 rpm (sustained)
- Muzzle velocity: 805 m/s (2,640 ft/s)
- Effective firing range: 2 km (1.2 mi) at +45° 3.98 km (13,100 ft) at +80°
- Maximum firing range: 6 km (3.7 mi) at +45° 4.2 km (14,000 ft) at +80°
- Feed system: 30-round box magazine

The 13.2 mm Breda Model 31 was a widely used Italian heavy machine gun produced by Società Italiana Ernesto Breda and used by the Italian Navy and Italian Army during World War II. At sea it was employed as a light anti-aircraft gun, while on land it was mounted on armored command vehicles where it was used as a heavy machine gun. After World War II it remained in use aboard the patrol boats of the Guardia di Finanza.

== History ==
The Breda Model 31 was a license built copy of the French Hotchkiss M1929 machine gun. Breda acquired a production license in 1929, but it did not enter production until 1931. The Model 31 was often mounted on single and twin mounts aboard surface ships and on a disappearing twin mount aboard submarines. The Model 31 was intended to provide close-range air defense, but like its counterparts in other nations, these small-caliber guns were found incapable of defending against low-level torpedo-bombers or high altitude level-bomber attacks because their bullets were too light and short ranged. Although a reliable gun with good performance, it was later replaced by the Breda 20/65 Mod. 1935.

== Construction ==
The Model 31 was a gas-operated, air-cooled machine gun with a tilting bolt action. It was fed by top mounted, semi-circular, thirty round magazines, with cooling air drawn through the sleeve to fins along the barrel.

== Naval use ==
Ship classes that carried the Breda Model 1931 include:

=== Italy ===
- Adua-class
- Archimede-class
- Argo-class
- Balilla-class
- Brin-class
- Cagni-class
- Calvi-class
- Ciclone-class
- Conte di Cavour-class
- Curtatone-class
- Flutto-class
- Foca-class
- Folgore-class
- Freccia-class
- Giussano-class
- Glauco-class
- Liuzzi-class
- Maestrale-class
- Marcello-class
- Marconi-class
- Navigatori-class
- Oriani-class
- Orsa-class
- Perla-class
- Sauro-class
- Sella-class
- Soldati-class
- Spica-class
- Squalo-class
- Trento-class
- Turbine-class
- Zara-class

=== Sweden ===
- T11 torpedo boat
- T14 torpedo boat

== Users ==
- (Italy) Italian Navy
- (Sweden) Swedish navy – designated 13,2 mm kulspruta M/It (13,2 mm ksp M/It)
- Nazi Germany
