= Operation Halberd =

World War II maintenance convoy operation

- Part of the Battle of the Mediterranean of the Second World War
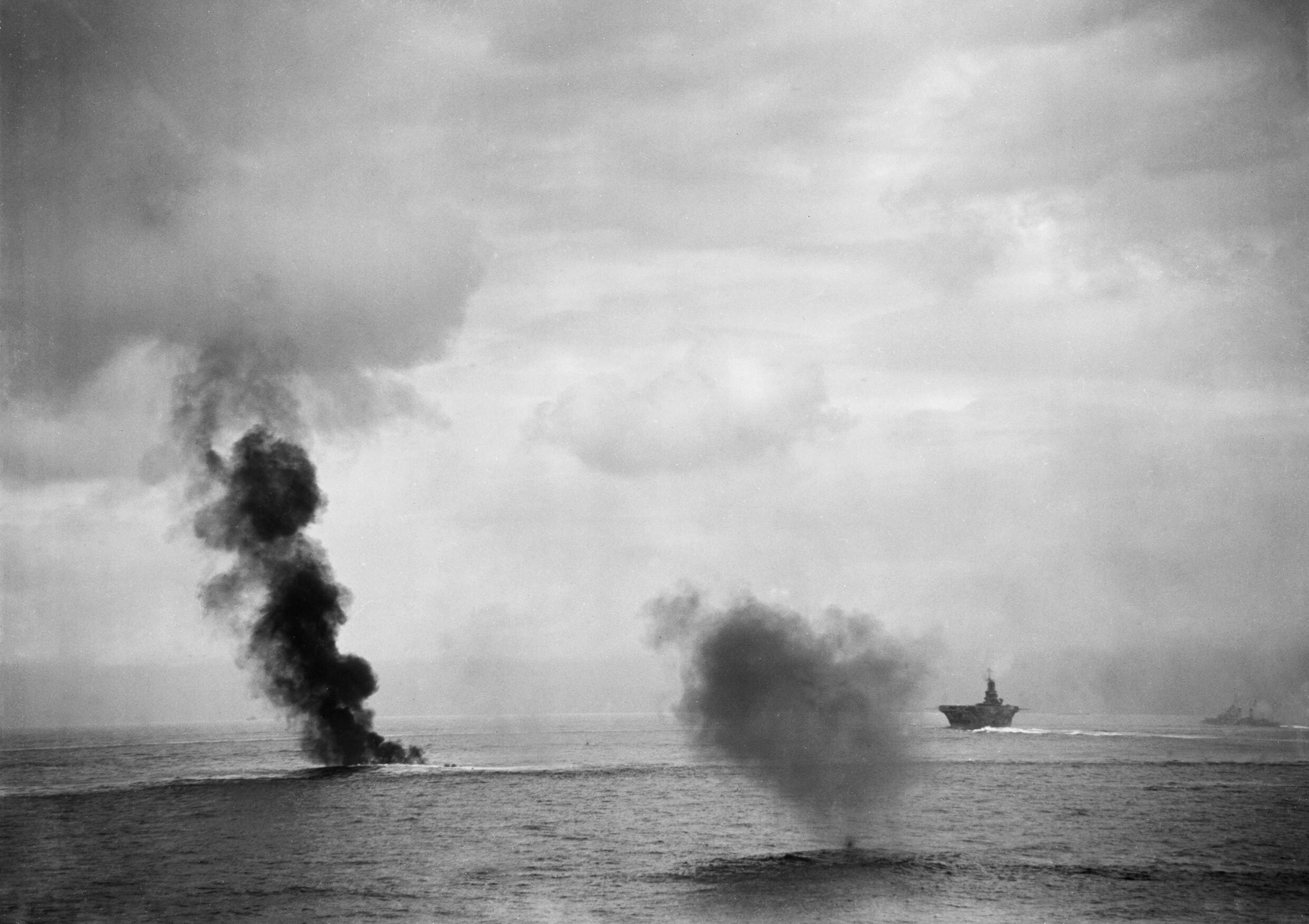
- An Italian torpedo bomber on fire and crashing during Operation Halberd, just beyond is HMS Ark Royal
| Date | 24–27 September 1941 |
| Location | Southwest of Calabria, Mediterranean Sea 37°31′0.12″N 10°46′0.12″E |
| Result | British victory |

Belligerents
| United Kingdom; Netherlands; Poland | Italy |

Commanders and leaders
| James Somerville | Angelo Iachino |

Strength
| 1 aircraft carrier; 3 battleships; 5 light cruisers; 18 destroyers; 8 submarines; 9 merchantmen; 66 aircraft | 2 battleships; 3 heavy cruisers; 2 light cruisers; 14 destroyers; 11 submarines; 8 torpedo boats; 130 aircraft |

Casualties and losses
| 8 killed; 1 battleship damaged; 1 merchantman scuttled; 4 aircraft destroyed | 83–90 killed; 1 submarine sunk; 21 aircraft destroyed |

Operation Halberd was a British naval operation that took place from 24 to 27 September 1941, during the Second World War. The British were attempting to deliver a Convoy GM 2 from Gibraltar to Malta. The convoy was escorted by several battleships and an aircraft carrier, to deter interference from the Italian surface fleet, while a close escort of cruisers and destroyers provided an anti-aircraft and anti-submarine screen.

The Italian fleet sortied after the convoy was detected but turned back after learning the strength of the escorting force. Air attacks by Italian bombers and fighters damaged several ships and forced one of the merchant vessels to be scuttled. The rest of the convoy arrived at Malta and the cargo was discharged.

== Background ==
=== Convoy WS 11X ===
Operation Halberd was the largest Malta supply effort yet. The merchant ships Ajax (7,549 GRT), HMS Breconshire (9,776 GRT), City of Calcutta (8,063 GRT), City of Lincoln (8,039 GRT), Clan Ferguson (7,347 GRT), Clan MacDonald (9,653 GRT), Dunedin Star (12, 891 GRT), Imperial Star (10,733 GRT) and Rowallan Castle (7,798 GRT). The convoy, carrying 81,000 long tons (82,000 t) of military equipment and supplies, sailed from Liverpool on 16 September and from the Clyde on 17 September as part of Convoy WS (Winston Specials) 11X, passing Gibraltar on 24 September 1941, with a close escort under the command of Rear-Admiral Harold Burrough.

=== Convoy escorts ===
Force H (Admiral James Somerville) accompanied the convoy and consisted of the battleships HMS Nelson, Rodney and Prince of Wales, with the aircraft carrier HMS Ark Royal with 12 Swordfish of 807 Naval Air Squadron (NAS) and 27 Fulmars of 808 NAS, the cruisers HMS Kenya, Edinburgh, Euryalus, Hermione and Sheffield, with the destroyers Cossack, HMS Duncan, Farndale, Foresight, Forester, Fury, ORP Garland, Gurkha, Heythrop, HNLMS Isaac Sweers, Laforey, Lance, Legion, Lightning, Lively, Oribi, ORP Piorun and Zulu. The submarines Unbeaten and HMS Ursula patrolled south of the Strait of Messina, HMS Upright and Utmost patrolled north of the Strait. The Polish submarine ORP Sokół patrolled north of Sicily with Upholder and HMS Urge; the Dutch submarine HNLMS O 21 patrolled south of Sardinia. Malta had recently received a reinforcement of 27 long-range fighters (22 Bristol Beaufighters and 5 Bristol Blenheims), that bombed and strafed Italian airfields on Sicily and Sardinia and were ready to provide air cover for the convoy after Force H, with Ark Royal, turned back at the Strait of Sicily.

== Prelude ==
=== Regia Marina ===
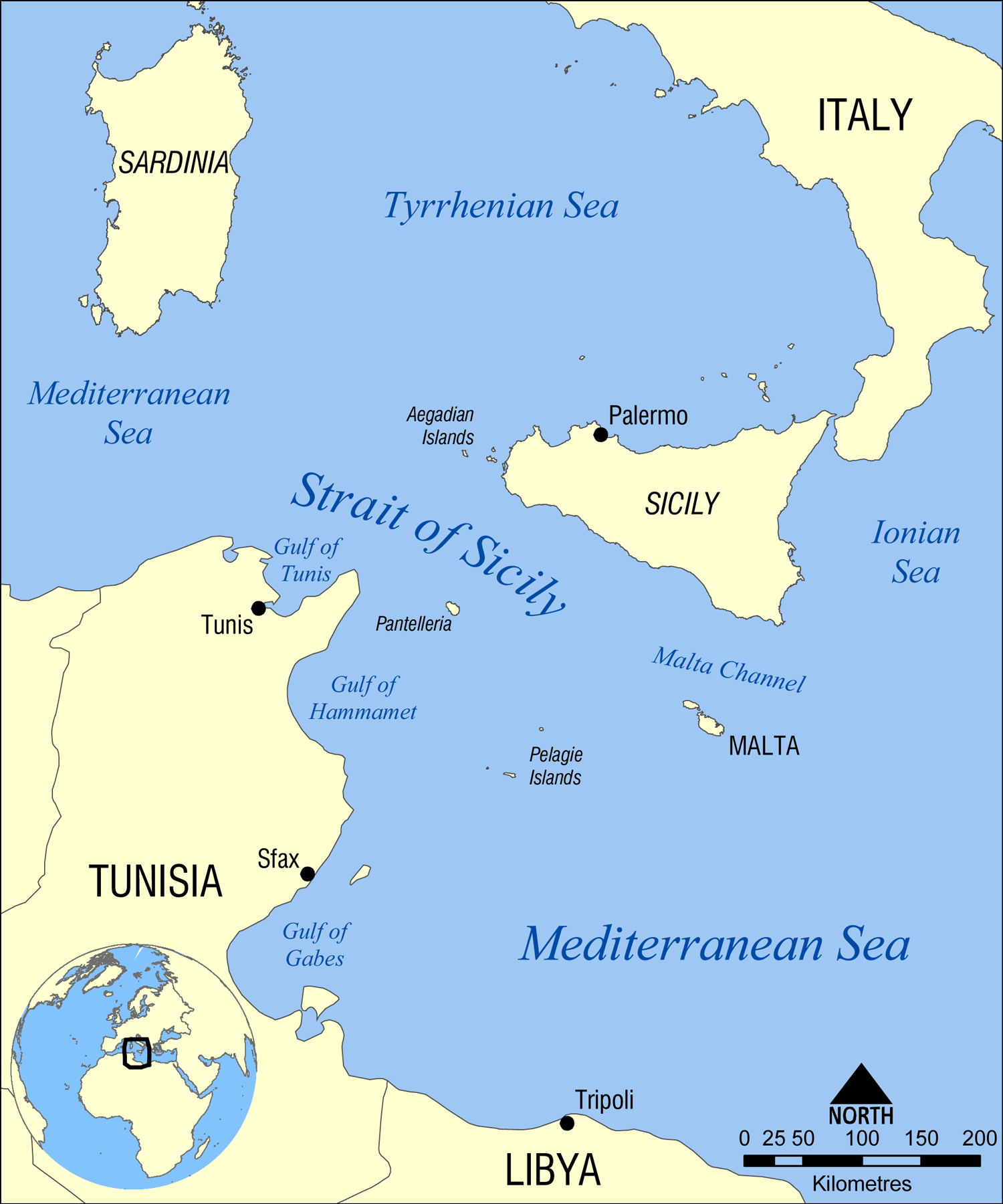
Map showing the Strait of Sicily

Italian submarines were sent to ambush the British battleships, thought to be planning a bombardment raid against the Italian coast. Dandolo, Adua and Turchese patrolled south of Ibiza while Axum, Serpente, Aradam and Diaspro patrolled east of the Balearic Islands. Squalo, Bandiera and Delfino patrolled south-west of Sardinia and Narvalo was off the African shore of the Sicilian narrows. The light cruisers Muzio Attendolo and Luigi di Savoia Duca degli Abruzzi of the 8th Cruiser Division sailed from Palermo with Maestrale-class destroyers Maestrale, Grecale and Scirocco of the 10th Destroyer Flotilla to take position off La Maddalena. The battleships Vittorio Veneto and Littorio were prepared to sortie from Naples with Granatiere, Fuciliere, Bersagliere and Gioberti of the 13th Destroyer Flotilla.

The destroyers, Nicoloso da Recco, Emanuele Pessagno and Folgore of the 16th Destroyer Flotilla while cruisers Trieste, Trento and Gorizia from Taranto with Corazziere, Carabiniere, Ascari and Lanciere of the 12th Destroyer Flotilla prepared to join them. Sardinia deployed thirty Macchi C.200, twenty Fiat CR.42 Falco fighters and twenty-six Savoia-Marchetti SM.79 and SM.84 torpedo bombers against the convoy while Sicily deployed fifteen C.200 and three Reggiane Re.2000 fighters and nine Junkers Ju 87 with twenty-four BR.20 bombers, SM.79 and SM.84 as medium bombers and plus three with torpedoes. More Italian aircraft were operational but were engaged on other operations, including bombing Malta.

=== Royal Navy ===
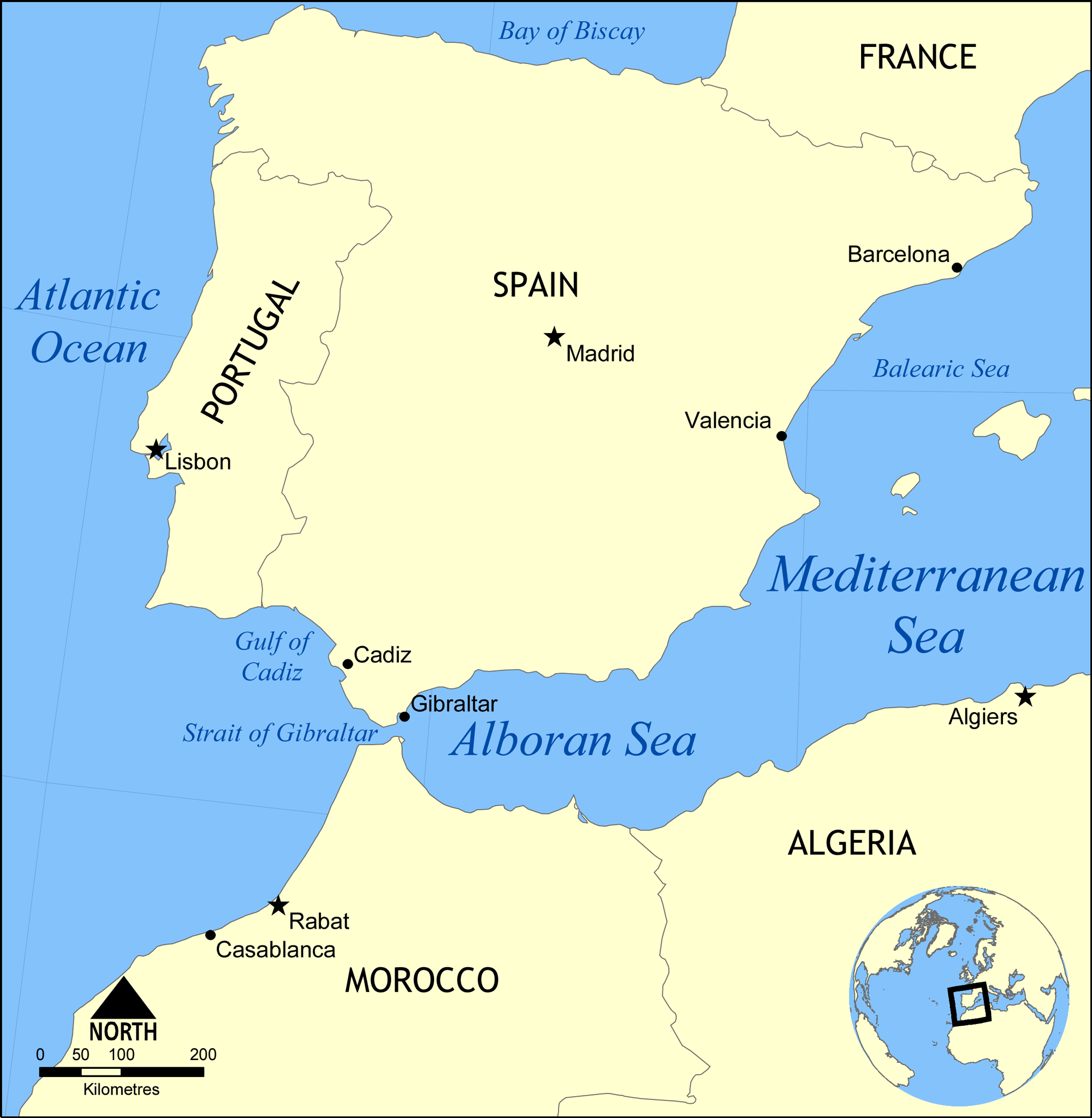
Map of the western Mediterranean

Ships of the Mediterranean Fleet operating from Alexandria began radio traffic to divert Luftwaffe attention to an operation in the eastern Mediterranean. On 24 September, at Gibraltar, Admiral Somerville shifted his flag from Nelson to Rodney and Nelson sailed west into the Atlantic at 18:15 escorted by Garland, Piorun and Isaac Sweers to give the impression the strength of Force H was being reduced. Nelson turned back after dusk to join the merchant ships from Convoy WS 11X, now renamed convoy GM 2 as the second convoy from Gibraltar to Malta. Force H separated from the merchant ships in the early hours of 25 September so Axis aerial reconnaissance might think only Force H was at sea. Fulmars from Ark Royal provided air cover over the convoy.

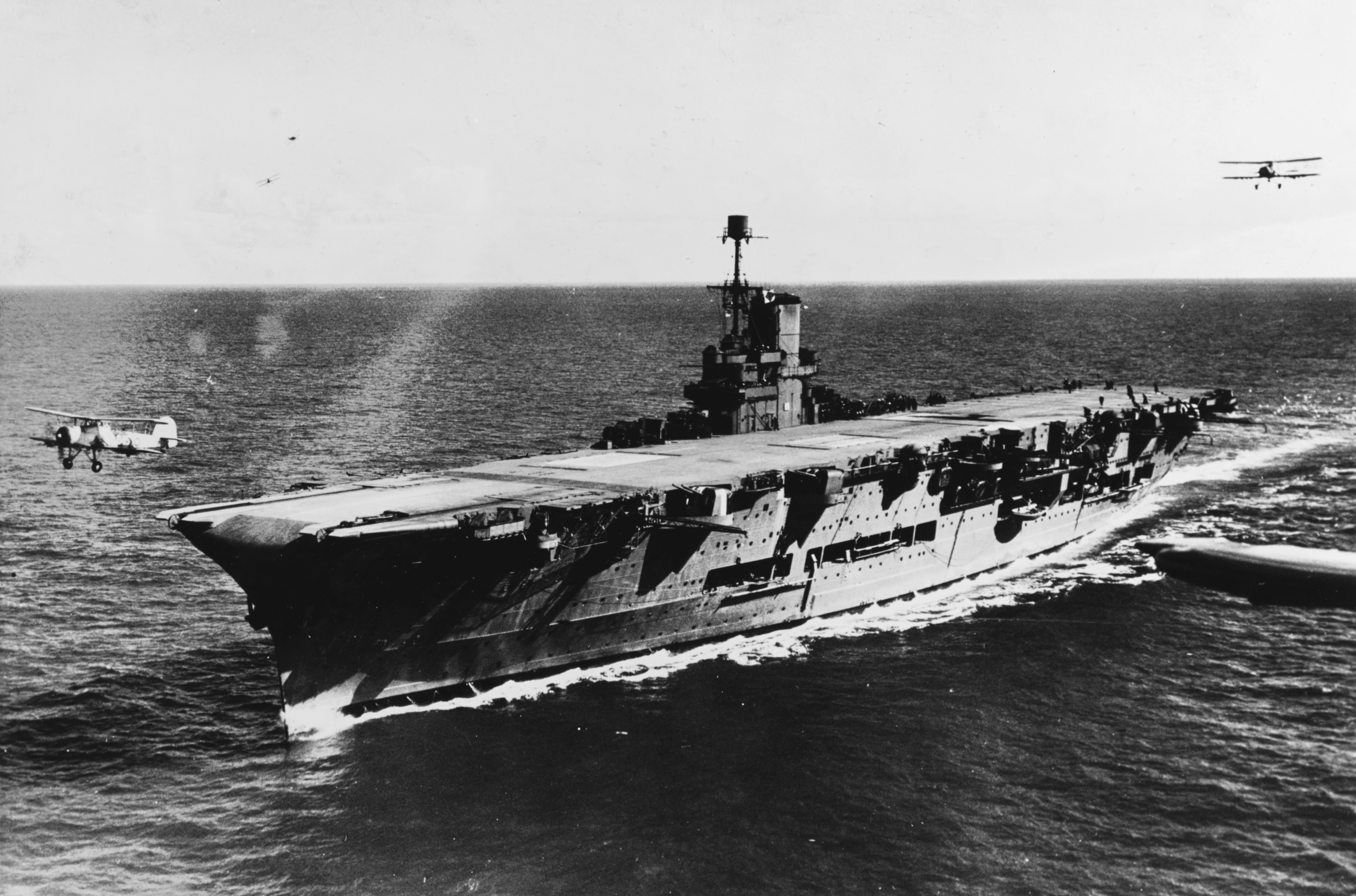
Pre-war photograph of HMS Ark Royal and Swordfish aircraft

Italian aircraft found Force H on the afternoon of 25 September, and assumed the battleships were on a bombardment raid against the Italian coast. A CANT Z.506 seaplane observing Force H at 09:32 on 26 September reported a battleship with an aircraft carrier incorrectly identified as HMS Furious. Since Ark Royal had been seen leaving Gibraltar, the Italians assumed Furious might be flying off aircraft to reinforce Malta while Ark Royal attacked Genoa. The Italian fleet sailed from Naples to take a defensive position with the 8th cruiser division off northern Sardinia, but was ordered not to engage the British fleet unless the Italians held a decisive superiority of forces.

== Battle ==
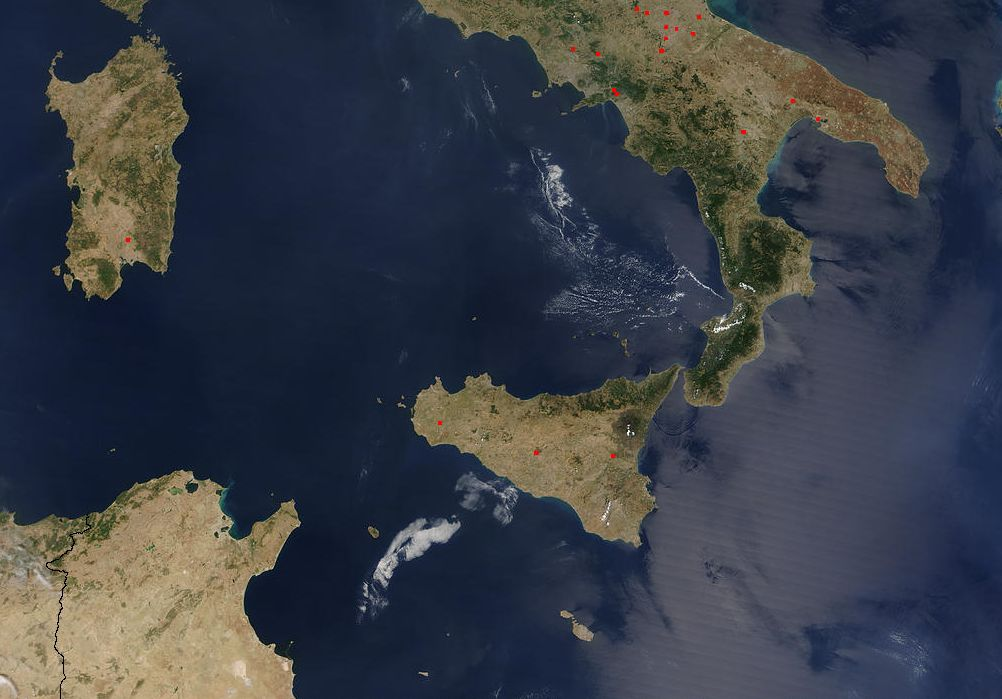
Satellite photograph of Tunisia, Sicily, Sardinia, the south of Italy and Malta

Force H rejoined the convoy at 07:10 27 September. Sixteen destroyers formed a curved screen ahead of the two columns of merchant ships. The port column was led by the cruiser Kenya, followed by Ajax, Clan MacDonald, Imperial Star, Rowallan Castle and City of Calcutta. The starboard column was led by the cruiser Edinburgh followed by Clan Ferguson, Dunedin Star, HMS Breconshire and City of Lincoln. Rodney took position behind the port wing of the screen followed by Prince of Wales. Nelson took position behind the starboard wing of the screen followed by Ark Royal in formation with the anti-aircraft cruisers Euryalus and Hermione. The cruiser Sheffield took position astern of the merchant ships, while the destroyers Piorun and Legion were astern of Ark Royal.

Italian aircraft identified Ark Royal at 08:10 and at 10:45 reported the convoy speed of 16 kn (30 km/h; 18 mph), which indicated that merchant ships were with the convoy. The battleships from Naples rendezvoused with the cruisers from Taranto at 10:40 and were joined by the 8th Cruiser Division at 11:48. The Italian fleet was faster than the battleships of Force H but was inferior in firepower. The Regia Aeronautica gave priority to fighter defence of bomber strikes, and the six fighters providing air cover over the Italian fleet could not travel more than 62 mi (100 km) from their base. Since Italian aircraft had reported only one British battleship, the Italian fleet received authorisation at noon to engage the British formation. The Regia Aeronautica was requested to provide increased air cover for the Italian fleet by 14:00.

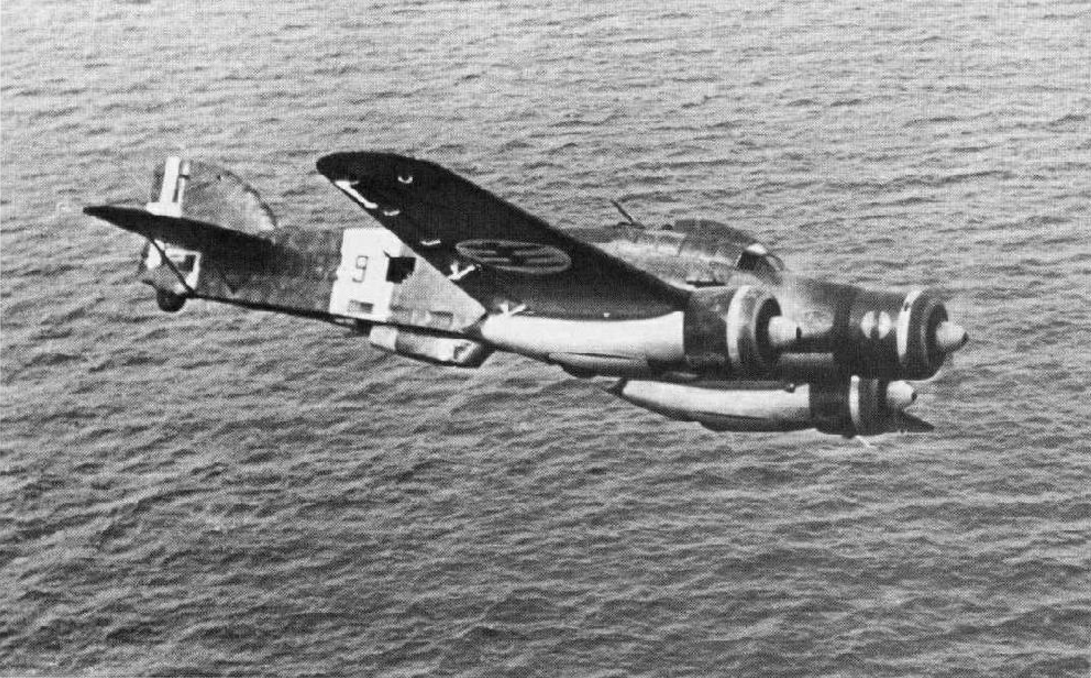
SM.79 torpedo-bomber

The Regia Aeronautica launched a strike of 28 SM.79 and SM.84 torpedo-bombers with 20 Cr.42 fighter escorts. The convoy came under air attack at 13:00. The strike was met by Fulmars and massed anti-aircraft fire. Three bombers pressed through the barrage of starboard wing destroyers to launch torpedoes at Nelson. Nelson turned to comb the torpedo tracks and inadvertently steadied on the reciprocal course of a torpedo which struck the port side of the forecastle. (Note: This account states that the torpedo attacks were carried out by SM.79 and BR.20 torpedo bombers.) Nelson slowed to 15 kn (28 km/h; 17 mph) but maintained position in the convoy. The Italian torpedo-bomber had released the torpedo at a range of only 450 yd (410 m) and endured concentrated anti-aircraft fire from Prince of Wales before being shot down by one of the Fulmars. Six more torpedo planes and a fighter failed to return from the strike. Friendly fire from Rodney and Prince of Wales shot down two Fulmars, and a patrolling Swordfish had been shot down by the Italian fighters before the strike ended at 13:30.

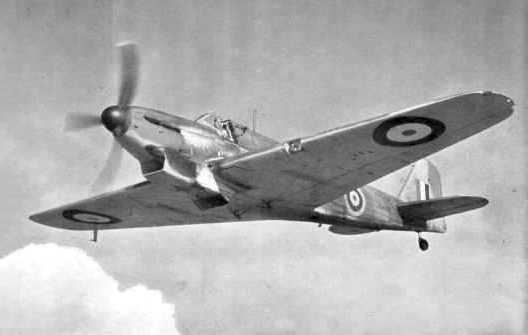
Fulmar Mk I in flight

The Italian fleet was shadowed by British aircraft from Malta beginning at 13:07. At 14:30 the Italian fleet was about 40 nmi (74 km; 46 mi) from the convoy, but "...decided to return home around 14:30 on 27 September when..." it "... learned that the British had two battleships, a carrier and six cruisers at sea." Aircraft from Ark Royal shadowed the Italian fleet from 15:15 to 17:50. Cr.42 fighters arrived at 15:30 to provide air cover but the squadron leader of the first flight was shot down by an Italian destroyer. Two more Italian pilots were lost when another flight of ten C.200s ran out of fuel and ditched in the sea. At 14:46 Prince of Wales, Rodney, Sheffield, Edinburgh, and six destroyers steamed toward the Italian fleet but were recalled at 17:00 before making contact and rejoined the convoy at 18:30.

Nelson, Rodney, Prince of Wales and Ark Royal turned west to return to Gibraltar, escorted by Duncan, Fury, Gurkha, Lance, Legion, Lively. Garland, Piorun and Isaac Sweers. Euryalus fell in astern of the port column of merchant ships while Sheffield and Hermione joined the starboard column as the remaining destroyers closed into a night steaming formation. The formation was attacked by a few torpedo bombers and Imperial Star was struck by a torpedo; Oribi took the damaged freighter in tow. Italian Motoscafo armato silurante (MAS torpedo boats) in the Strait of Messina but failed to find the convoy.

=== 28 September ===
Hermione detached from the convoy to bombard Pantelleria to put the airfield out of action when the convoy arrived in Malta. The damaged Imperial Star was scuttled without loss of life to maintain convoy speed and the convoy arrived in Malta on 28 September. Force H was attacked on its return journey by three submarines and Adua was sunk by Gurkha and Legion. Another Ark Royal Fulmar fell to friendly fire from Prince of Wales, raising British aircraft losses to three Fulmars from friendly fire and one Swordfish shot down by the Italians. Italian aircraft losses were 21 including seven bombers and one fighter from enemy action, one fighter from friendly fire and ten fighters from fuel exhaustion.

== Aftermath ==
Convoy GM 2 was the final revictualling operation to Malta in 1941 and showed that the Royal Navy had gained much experience in defending convoys under attack from surface ships, submarines and aircraft. The convoy arrived at the cost of a battleship damaged by a torpedo and the loss of Imperial Star for the Italian loss of the submarine Adua and 21 aircraft (ten aircraft ran out of fuel and ditched). In 2024, Andrew Boyd called this a fine achievement, that established Malta as an offensive base for the rest of the year. Boyd wrote that signals intelligence, air reconnaissance and staff work were excellent. The presence of an aircraft carrier was of the highest importance and even the Fulmar fighter could compete with the Italian Falco and accounted for about half of the Italia aircraft losses, causing much disorganisation amongst the rest. The Swordfish aircraft were permanent danger to Italian ships, seriously hampered Italian submarines and provided useful tactical reconnaissance during the operation. Ark Royal was unique in carrying 40 per cent more aircraft than the succeeding Illustrious-class aircraft carriers. Having been with Force H for a year, Ark Royal had reached a high pitch of efficiency and even without radar had set a standard of fighter direction not reached again until Operation Pedestal in August 1942.

Somerville was knighted in recognition of his command of Force H during Operation Halberd. It was the second time Somerville had received that honour, and it occasioned a memorable congratulatory message from Andrew Cunningham "Fancy, twice a knight at your age".

== Order of battle ==
=== Convoy GM 2 ===
Gibraltar to Malta (ex-Convoy WS 11X) 25–29 September 1941
| Name | Year | Flag | GRT | Notes |
|---|---|---|---|---|
| MV Ajax | 1931 | United Kingdom | 7,549 | |
| HMS Breconshire | 1939 | Royal Navy | 9,776 | Convoy Commodore, Captain Colin Hutchison |
| SS City of Calcutta | 1940 | United Kingdom | 8,063 | |
| SS City of Lincoln | 1938 | United Kingdom | 8,039 | |
| SS Clan Ferguson | 1938 | United Kingdom | 7,347 | |
| SS Clan MacDonald | 1939 | United Kingdom | 9,653 | |
| MV Dunedin Star | 1936 | United Kingdom | 12,891 | |
| MV Imperial Star | 1935 | United Kingdom | 10,733 | Air torpedo, 27 September 1941, 37°31′N, 10°46′E, scuttled next day |
| MV Rowallan Castle | 1939 | United Kingdom | 7,798 | |

=== Convoy MG 2 ===
Malta to Gibraltar (Note: These ships had arrived in Operation Substance.)
| Name | Year | Flag | GRT | Notes |
Part 1
| MV Melbourne Star | 1936 | United Kingdom | 11,086 | 26–29 September |
Part 2
| SS City of Pretoria | 1937 | United Kingdom | 8,049 | 27–30 September |
| MV Port Chalmers | 1933 | United Kingdom | 8,535 | 27–30 September |

Convoy MG 2 escort
| Name | Flag | Type | Notes |
|---|---|---|---|
| HMS Gloxinia | Royal Navy | Flower-class corvette | 27 September |

=== Convoy escorts ===
Convoy escorts
| Name | Flag | Type | Notes |
Force A
| HMS Nelson | Royal Navy | Nelson-class battleship | Flag |
| HMS Prince of Wales | Royal Navy | King George V-class battleship | |
| HMS Rodney | Royal Navy | Nelson-class battleship | |
| HMS Ark Royal | Royal Navy | aircraft carrier | |
13th Destroyer Flotilla
| HMS Duncan | Royal Navy | D-class destroyer | |
8th Destroyer Flotilla
| HMS Fury | Royal Navy | F-class destroyer | |
4th Destroyer Flotilla
| HMS Gurkha | Royal Navy | Tribal-class destroyer | Sank Adua, 30 September |
| HNLMS Isaac Sweers | Royal Netherlands Navy | Gerard Callenburgh-class destroyer | |
| ORP Piorun | Polish Navy | N-class destroyer | |
| ORP Garland | Polish Navy | G-class destroyer | |
| HMS Legion | Royal Navy | L-class destroyer | Sank Adua, 30 September |
| HMS Lance | Royal Navy | L-class destroyer | |
| HMS Lively | Royal Navy | L-class destroyer | |
Force X
| HMS Hermione | Royal Navy | Dido-class cruiser | 15th CS Pantellaria attack |
| HMS Euryalus | Royal Navy | Dido-class cruiser | |
| HMS Kenya | Royal Navy | Fiji-class cruiser | 10th CS Rear-Admiral Harold Burrough |
| HMS Edinburgh | Royal Navy | Town-class cruiser | 18th Cruiser Squadron |
| HMS Sheffield | Royal Navy | Town-class cruiser | |
4th Destroyer Flotilla
| HMS Cossack | Royal Navy | Tribal-class destroyer | |
19th Destroyer Flotilla
| HMS Zulu | Royal Navy | Tribal-class destroyer | |
| HMS Farndale | Royal Navy | F-class destroyer | |
| HMS Foresight | Royal Navy | F-class destroyer | |
| HMS Forester | Royal Navy | F-class destroyer | |
| HMS Laforey | Royal Navy | L-class destroyer | |
| HMS Lightning | Royal Navy | L-class destroyer | |
Rescue ships
| HMS Heythrop | Royal Navy | Hunt-class destroyer | |
| HMS Oribi | Royal Navy | O-class destroyer | |
Force S
| RFA Brown Ranger | Royal Navy | Ranger-class tanker | Tanker |
| HMS Fleur de Lys | Royal Navy | Flower-class corvette | Tanker escort |

=== Submarine patrols ===
British submarine patrols
| Name | Flag | Type | Notes |
North of Sicily
| ORP Sokół | Polish Navy | U-class submarine | Offensive patrol |
| HMS Trusty | Royal Navy | Triton-class submarine | Offensive patrol |
| HMS Upholder | Royal Navy | U-class submarine | Offensive patrol |
| HMS Upright | Royal Navy | U-class submarine | Offensive patrol |
| HMS Urge | Royal Navy | U-class submarine | Offensive patrol |
| HMS Utmost | Royal Navy | U-class submarine | Offensive patrol |
South of Strait of Messina
| HMS Unbeaten | Royal Navy | U-class submarine | Offensive patrol |
| HMS Ursula | Royal Navy | U-class submarine | Offensive patrol |
Off Cagliari
| HNLMS O-21 | Royal Netherlands Navy | O 21-class submarine | 3 October, sank SS Oued Yquem (1,369 GRT) 40°58′N, 09°59′E |

== Regia Aeronautica ==
Key
| Name | Abbr. | English |
|---|---|---|
| Stormo | — | Usually two Gruppi of the same aircraft type |
| Gruppo | — | Two Squadriglie of multi-engined machines, three Squadriglie of single-engined aircraft |
| Squadra Aerea | — | Area command reporting to Comando Supremo in Rome |
| Autonomo | Aut. | Independent Gruppi and Squadriglie under Squadra command |
| Caccia Terrestre | C.T. | Land fighters |
| Caccia Marittima | C.M. | Maritime fighters |
| Bombardamento Terrestre | B.T. | Land bombers |
| Bombardamento Marittima | B.M. | Floatplanes |
| Bombardamento a Tuffo | B.a.T. | Dive bombers |
| Ricognizioni Marittima | R.M. | Reconnaissance Floatplanes |
| Ricognizione Strategica Terrestre | R.S.T. | Str R, Land Strategic Reconnaissance |
| Observazioni Aerea | O.A. | Tac R, Tactical reconnaissance |
| Aerosiluranti | A.S./Sil | Torpedo bomber |

=== Regia aeronautica in Sardinia and Sicily ===
| Base | Flag | Type | Role | No. | Serv. | Notes |
Aeronautica Sardegna (26 September 1941)
| Decimomannu (Cagliari) | Kingdom of Italy | S.84 | Torpedo bomber | 29 | 19 | |
| Decimomannu (Cagliari) | Kingdom of Italy | S.79 Sparviero | Torpedo bomber | 4 | 4 | |
| Elmas (Cagliari) | Kingdom of Italy | S.79 Sparviero | Torpedo bomber | 14 | 13 | |
| Elmas (Cagliari) | Kingdom of Italy | Cant Z.501 Gabbiano | Str R | 6 | 3 | |
| Elmas (Cagliari) | Kingdom of Italy | Cant Z.506 Airone | General | 9 | 6 | |
| Alghero | Kingdom of Italy | Cant Z.1007 Alcione | Bomber | 21 | 12 | |
| Monserrato (Cagliari) | Kingdom of Italy | Cr.42 Falco | Fighter | 35 | 29 | |
| Monserrato (Cagliari) | Kingdom of Italy | MC.200 Saetta | Fighter | 5 | 4 | 32 more, 27 September |
| Monserrato (Cagliari) | Kingdom of Italy | G.50 Freccia | Fighter | 10 | 7 | |
| Olbia | Kingdom of Italy | Cant Z.501 Gabbiano | Str R | 10 | 7 | |
| Olbia | Kingdom of Italy | Cant Z.506 Airone | | 8 | 5 | |
| Total | Kingdom of Italy | — | — | 134 | 117 | c. 60% serviceability |
Aeronautica Sicila (26 September 1941)
| Chinisia | Kingdom of Italy | Z.1007 Alcione | Bomber | 9 | 8 | |
| Trapani | Kingdom of Italy | Z.1007 Alcione | Bomber | 11 | 6 | |
| Trapani | Kingdom of Italy | Ju 87 Stuka | Dive bomber | 20 | 12 | |
| Trapani | Kingdom of Italy | Cr.42 Falco | Fighter | 28 | 16 | |
| Trapani | Kingdom of Italy | MC.200 Saetta | Fighter | 9 | 3 | |
| Trapani | Kingdom of Italy | Re.2000 Falco I | Fighter | 11 | 3 | |
| Sciacca | Kingdom of Italy | S.79 Sparviero | Bomber | 21 | 9 | |
| Catania | Kingdom of Italy | BR.20 Cigogna | Bomber | 18 | 9 | |
| Catania | Kingdom of Italy | Cr.42 Falco | Fighter | 15 | 9 | |
| Catania | Kingdom of Italy | MC.200 Saetta | Fighter | 67 | 47 | |
| Gerbini | Kingdom of Italy | BR.20 Cigogna | Bomber | 15 | 6 | |
| Gerbini | Kingdom of Italy | S.84 | Torpedo bomber | 5 | 3 | |
| Gerbini | Kingdom of Italy | S.79 Sparviero | Bomber | 6 | 5 | |
| Comiso | Kingdom of Italy | MC.202 Folgore | Fighter | 28 | 28 | |
| Gela | Kingdom of Italy | MC.200 Saetta | Fighter | 24 | 15 | |
| Gela | Kingdom of Italy | Cr.42 Falco | Fighter | 8 | 5 | |
| Syracuse | Kingdom of Italy | Z.506 Airone | Str R | 6 | 3 | |
| Augusta | Kingdom of Italy | Z.506 Airone | Str R | 11 | 8 | |
| Augusta | Kingdom of Italy | Z.501 Gabbiano | Str R | 17 | 15 | |
| Stagnone | Kingdom of Italy | Z.501 Gabbiano | Str R | 12 | 7 | |
| Total | Kingdom of Italy | — | — | 341 | 217 | c. 63% serviceability |

== Regia Marina ==
Ships
| Name | Flag | Type | Notes |
Palermo
| Muzio Attendolo | Kingdom of Italy | Condottieri-class cruiser | 8th Cruiser Division |
| Abruzzi | Kingdom of Italy | Condottieri-class cruiser | 8th Cruiser Division |
Taranto
| Andrea Doria | Kingdom of Italy | Andrea Doria-class battleship | |
| Duilio | Kingdom of Italy | Andrea Doria-class battleship | |
| Giulio Cesare | Kingdom of Italy | Conte di Cavour-class battleship | |

=== Submarines ===
Submarine patrols
| Name | Flag | Class | Notes |
North of Cap Ferrat
| Adua | Kingdom of Italy | Acciaio-class submarine | Offensive patrol, depth-charged, sunk, 30 September |
| Dandolo | Kingdom of Italy | Marcello-class submarine | Offensive patrol |
| Turchese | Kingdom of Italy | Perla-class submarine | Offensive patrol |
North of Cap Bougaroûn
| Axum | Kingdom of Italy | Adua-class submarine | Offensive patrol |
| Serpente | Kingdom of Italy | Argonauta-class submarine | Offensive patrol, depth-charged, 29 September |
| Aradam | Kingdom of Italy | Adua-class submarine | Offensive patrol |
| Diaspro | Kingdom of Italy | Perla-class submarine | Offensive patrol, depth-charged, 29 September |
North of Cap de Fer
| Squalo | Kingdom of Italy | Squalo-class submarine | Offensive patrol |
| Fratelli Bandiera | Kingdom of Italy | Bandiera-class submarine | Offensive patrol |
| Delfino | Kingdom of Italy | Squalo-class submarine | Offensive patrol |
Off Cap Bon
| Narvalo | Kingdom of Italy | Squalo-class submarine | Offensive patrol |

== See also ==
- Battle of the Mediterranean
- Malta Convoys
