= Operation Hurry =

1940 operation in the Mediterranean

- Part of the Battle of the Mediterranean of the Second World War
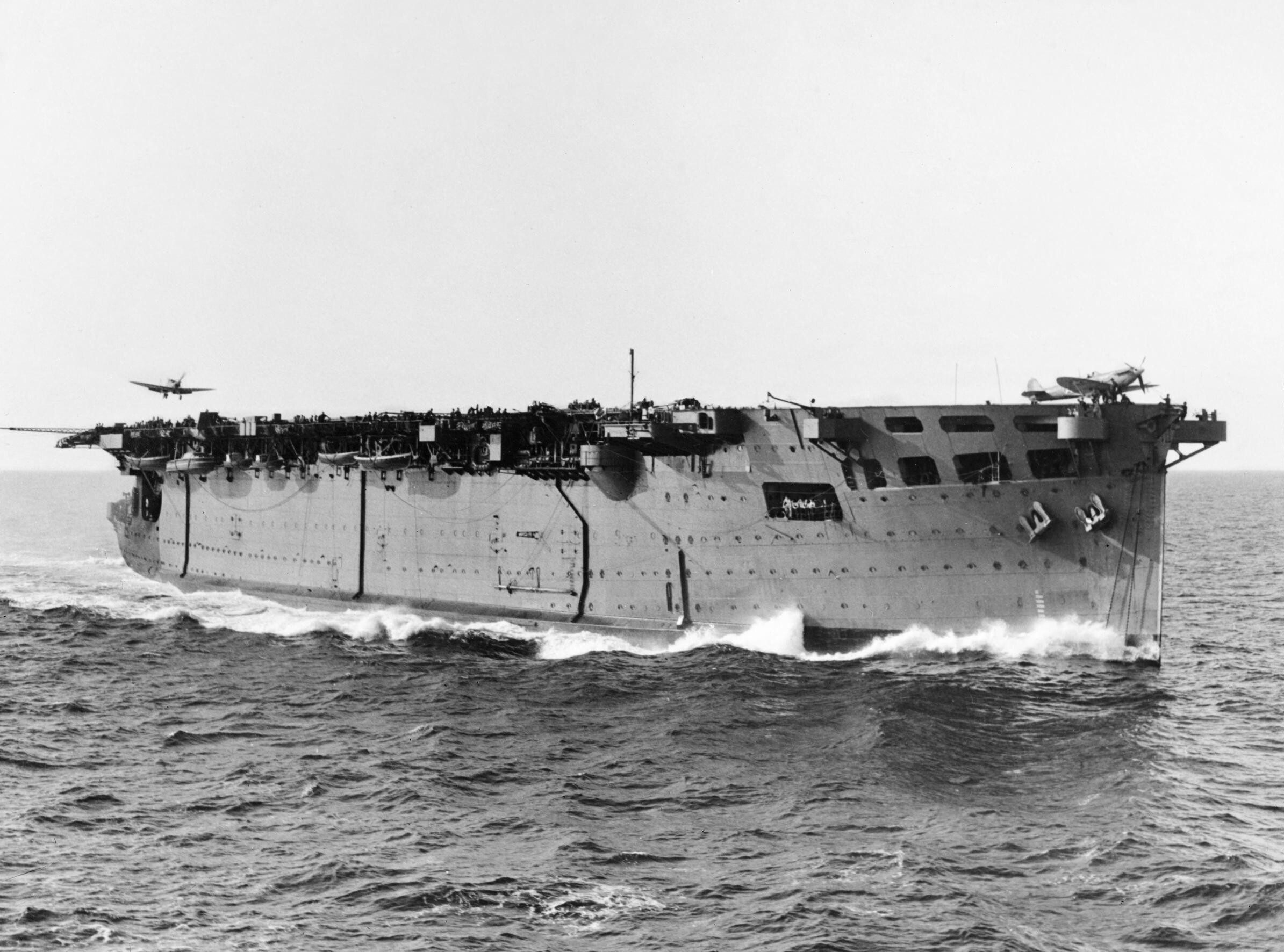
- HMS Argus
Date	31 July – 4 August 1940
Location	western Mediterranean Sea
Result	British victory

Belligerents
United Kingdom	Kingdom of Italy

Commanders and leaders
James Somerville; Andrew Cunningham	

Units involved
Force H; Fleet Air Arm	Regia Aeronautica; Regia Marina

Casualties and losses
2 aircrew killed; 2 aircrew taken prisoner; 2 aircraft lost	4 aircraft destroyed (Sardinia); 2 aircraft shot down

Operation Hurry (31 July – 4 August 1940) was the first British operation in a series that have come to be known as Club Runs. The goal of the operation was to fly twelve Hurricane Mk I fighters from HMS Argus to Malta, guided by two Skuas of the Fleet Air Arm. Force H, based in Gibraltar, took the opportunity to raid Elmas airfield in Sardinia and conduct a deception operation with HMS Enterprise. The Mediterranean Fleet conducted diversions in the eastern Mediterranean and the Aegean Sea.

A squadron of Hurricanes had reinforced Malta, Elmas airfield had been bombed and Italian bombers had been deterred by anti-aircraft fire and the Skuas of HMS Ark Royal. Attacks on the Italian mainland had been shown to be possible and the Regia Aeronautica had been found to be less formidable than had been feared; both fleets had been attacked but only one bomb hit by a dud and some near-misses on the British ships had been achieved; the battle fleet of the Regia Marina remained in port.

== Background ==
=== Malta, 1940 ===
Malta, is a Mediterranean island of 122 sq mi (320 km^{2}) and the island group had been a British colony since 1814. By the 1940s, the island had a population of 275,000 but local farmers could feed only one-third of the population, the deficit being made up by imports. Malta was a staging post on the British Suez Canal sea route to India, East Africa, the oilfields of Iraq and Iran, India and the Far East. The island was also close to the Sicilian Channel between Sicily and Tunis. After the Italian entry into the Second World War (10 June 1940), Malta was used as a base of operations by the Royal Air Force (RAF) and Fleet Air Arm (FAA), sea and submarine operations by the Royal Navy against Axis supply convoys from Italy to Italian Libya. On 11 June 1940, Italy began the Siege of Malta, the first step in an Italian plan to gain control of the Mediterranean. The Italians intended to bomb or starve Malta into submission, by attacking its ports, towns, cities and Allied shipping supplying the island. After over a month of bombardment, the troops on Malta were beginning to run low on supplies and equipment, including aircraft, to defend the island. Doubt was expressed at the Admiralty whether Malta was worth the supplies it required and some even planned on letting Malta work on the few supplies that were left. The decision was made to reinforce substantially the island air defences.

== Prelude ==
=== HMS Argus ===
Flying Hurricane reinforcements across France to North Africa in June 1940, thence to Malta had been a partial success but after the French surrender in June, this practice became impossible. Aircraft could be carried in merchant ships to West Africa, assembled and flown to Egypt on the Takoradi route or sailed round the Cape to Egypt. On 12 July the Admiralty reported that twelve Hurricanes bound for Malta and another twelve for Egypt were due to be sent by merchant ship from Britain to Gibraltar and wondered if the ship could sail direct to Malta. Somerville suggested using an aircraft carrier. If ferried to about 350–400 mi (560–640 km) from Malta, avoiding the Regia Marina and Regia Aeronautica bases in Italian Libya, Sardinia, Pantellaria and Sicily, for the Hurricanes to fly the rest of the way; submarines could be used to shift personnel and equipment.

The FAA had no pilots trained on modern fighters; during July, nine fighter sergeant-pilots from RAF Fighter Command were sent to RAF Uxbridge and called 418 Flight. The pilots had served secondments to the FAA and had received training in flying from aircraft carriers. The pilots collected Hurricanes and travelled to Glasgow where they were briefed on the first Club Run and joined by five RAF officers. The aircraft and pilots were embarked on the aircraft carrier Argus (Captain Henry Bovell) which sailed on 23 July with twelve Hurricane Mk1s, escorted by the destroyers HMS Encounter, Greyhound, Gallant and Hotspur. A suggestion that two Blenheim bombers be embarked on Argus to act as guides was dismissed as impractical, leading to two Skuas being substituted, along with a couple of spare pilots, who were to travel in the Skuas. The voyage to Gibraltar was uneventful and the Hurricanes were reassembled and put on the fight deck. A Sunderland flying boat, one of two which were to fly with the Hurricanes to rescue pilots who came down in the sea, was loaded with spare parts. The second Sunderland embarked 23 RAF ground crew to maintain the Hurricanes on Malta. (Note: Operation Hurry became the first of the Club Runs which, from August 1940 to March 1942, delivered Hurricanes and then Spitfires until October 1942. The runs carried 764 fighters, twelve turned back and landed on the aircraft carrier and 34 of which were lost.)

=== Plan ===
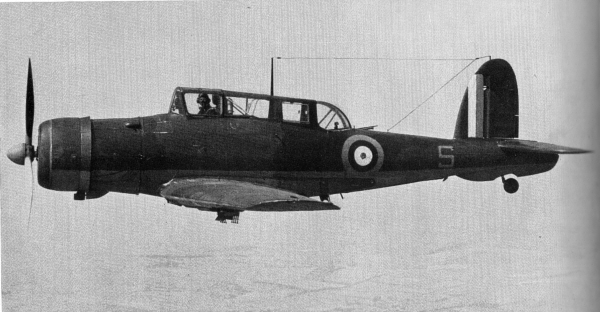
Photograph of a Blackburn Skua, similar to the two in Operation Hurry

The plan for Hurry was for Group II, the aircraft carrier Argus, with twelve Hawker Hurricane Mk Is on board, to sail within flying distance of Malta and dispatch the Hurricanes, with two two-seater Skuas to assist with navigation. They would be met by two Sunderland flying boats from Malta to guide them in. Argus was to sail with the battleships HMS Valiant and Resolution, the cruisers HMS Arethusa, Delhi and Enterprise and the destroyers HMS Faulknor, Forester, Foresight, Foxhound, Fearless, Escapade, Active and Wrestler of Force H. Group I, the aircraft carrier HMS Ark Royal protected by battlecruiser HMS Hood and the destroyers Faulknor, Foresight, Forester and Foxhound was to conduct Operation Crush, an attack by Fairey Swordfish bombers and minelayers on Elmas airfield at Cagliari in Sardinia. Operation Spark, a wireless deception carried out by the cruiser Enterprise, was to distract the Italians by reporting a suspicious boat off the coast of Menorca. The operations required all the ships of Force H (Vice-Admiral James Somerville, in Hood).

=== 31 July – morning 1 August ===
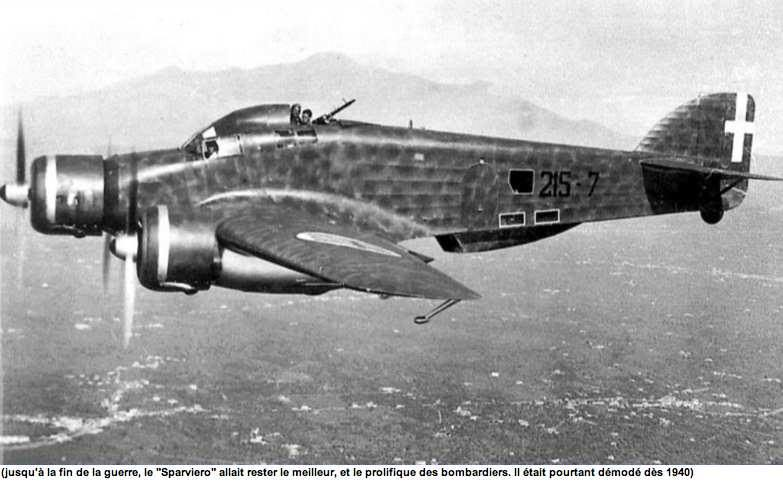
Savoia Marchetti SM 79 Sparviero (Sparrowhawk)

On 31 July, after a reconnaissance by aircraft from 200 Squadron, Argus sailed at 8:00 a.m. with its four destroyers and Force H, Ark Royal, the battleships Hood, Valiant and Resolution, two cruisers and the six destroyers at 17 kn (31 km/h; 20 mph), Ark Royal flying anti-submarine patrols. The wind increased which reduced the effectiveness of Asdic as destroyers pitched up and down. On 1 August at 8:00 a.m. three Skuas took off from Ark Royal to attack a shadowing aircraft and shot it down. Radar contacts from the set on Valiant caused numerous false alarms because the British aircraft did not carry Identification friend or foe (IFF) At 12:30 p.m., with six Skuas overhead, the fleet sailed in open order and at 5:10 p.m. more Skuas took off.

Eight Italian SM.79bis (Sparrowhawks) approached at 5:49 p.m. and were turned back by the Skuas. Soon afterwards, another nine SM.79bis bombers closed on the fleet from the north-west. The ships turned 40° to port and the anti-aircraft fire by the ships damaged an SM.79bis which turned away; the other aircraft dropped about eighty bombs, which fell short. Skuas of 803 Naval Air Squadron from Ark Royal shot down an SM.79bis, which had the general commanding the Sardinia-based bombers on board, with no survivors. The attack was not pressed with as much vigour as an earlier attack in July, that Somerville ascribed to the two weeks' training he had arranged for the ships' anti-aircraft gunners. Supermarina had sent the submarines Argo, Axum, Diaspro, Manara, Medusa, Neghelli, Scirè, Turchese in two patrol lines off Cap Bougaroûn in eastern Algeria, which remained until 9 August.

== Operations ==
=== Operation Hurry ===
Location map of Malta

On 1 August, the pilots received a briefing from Bovell, Captain of Argus, revealing that they were bound for Malta. The pilots were aghast when they were told where they were to take off from, which was far outside the range of a Hurricane. Flight-Lieutenant Duncan Balden, the commander of 418 Flight, refused to take off so far west of Malta and eventually the captain broke radio silence to consult the authorities in Britain who supported the Hurricane pilots. The take-off point was moved to 37° 40', N 007° 20' E 360 nmi (670 km; 410 mi) instead of 400 nmi (740 km; 460 mi), about 120 nmi (220 km; 140 mi) south-west of Cagliari. Now that the position of Force H was known, Bovell decided that the Hurricanes must fly as soon as possible after dawn the next day, 2 August.

Two flights of six Hurricanes each led by a Skua, which carried a navigator, were to make the journey but it was found that the two FAA pilots lacked experience on Skuas and two of the Hurricane pilots, Flying Officer Bradbury and Sergeant Harry Ayre volunteered, with Sub Lieutenant W. R. Nowell and Captain K. L. Ford (Royal Marines) as navigators. The fourteen aircraft ranged on deck made the take-off run look exceedingly small to the pilots and at 4:45 a.m., the first Skua took a long time to start, delaying take-off for thirty minutes. The Skua began its take-off run, bounced on the ramp at the end of the flight deck and sank below the bows, skimming the sea, as it built up flying speed.

The six Hurricanes took off easily, having more powerful engines and this made room for the second flight. The Skuas and Hurricanes avoided Pantelleria and arrived at Malta after a flight of two hours and twenty minutes, having flown 380 nmi (700 km; 440 mi). As the Hurricanes began to land at Luqa, Sergeant Jock Robinson crashed on landing, due to a "faulty petrol gauge" but really because his vic of three aircraft beat up the airfield, Rose rolling his Hurricane as the other two climbed steeply. Rose came in to land with a low steep turn and as he lined up with the runway, the engine cut, the Hurricane flipped on its back and ran through three stone walls, Rose being lucky to suffer only mild concussion. The Hurricane pilots had been under the impression that their carrier experience was being used to ferry the Hurricanes to Malta and there was uproar when they were told that they were to stay on the island, rather than fly back to Gibraltar in the Sunderlands. The Hurricane pilots had to wait for the rest of the spares to arrive in the submarines HMS Pandora and Proteus. The pilots took turns to be the readiness flight, sitting in their cockpits waiting for the Italian bombers but there were no attacks, only reconnaissance flights for the next three days.

==== Mediterranean Fleet ====
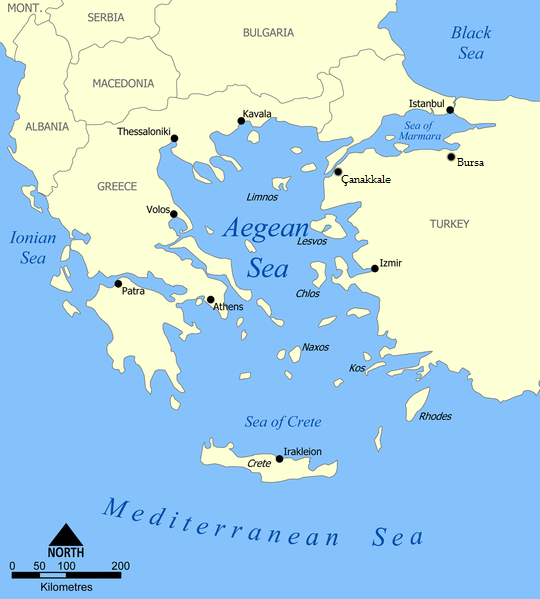
Map of the Aegean Sea

The Mediterranean Fleet sailed early on 27 July to cover Convoy AS 2 (Aegean South, Alexandria to Piraeus) from the north which was escorted by two cruisers and four destroyers. On 23 July the cruiser HMS Orion and the destroyers HMAS Vampire and HMS Vendetta practised a ruse, off Kastellorizo near the Turkish coast, pretending to make landing preparations. The deception was repeated on 26 July before Convoy AS 2 sailed, when the armed boarding vessels Chakla and Fiona also made spurious preparations for a landing on Kastellorizo. A delay to the departure of Argus from Gibraltar to 31 July required Admiral Andrew Cunningham, the commander of the Mediterranean Fleet, to alter his plans to divert Italian attention from the western Mediterranean. The battleships HMS Malaya, Royal Sovereign and Warspite and the aircraft carrier HMS Eagle with the cruisers Neptune and HMAS Sydney and ten destroyers, were to sail between Crete and Libya during 1 August.

Cruisers and destroyers conducted a sweep in the Aegean with a demonstration westwards, via the Kithera Channel, during the evening of 1 August. The intention was to give the impression of operations in the central Mediterranean, deterring the Italian navy based in Sicily and southern Italy from voyaging westwards. The Regia Aeronautica attacked the ships from 27 to 29 July but achieved only a hit on Liverpool which was a dud and several near-misses. A Greek ship, Ermione, transporting aviation fuel to the Dodecanese Islands for the Italians, was sunk when Neptune and Sydney sailed into the Gulf of Athens. The battleship and aircraft carrier sortie had to be cut short when Malaya had engine trouble, returning with Eagle to Alexandria on 30 July. (Note: Malaya had chronic problems with salt water leaking into its condensers.) The activity in the eastern Mediterranean was thought to have created indecision in the minds of Supermarina, the Italian naval staff, who kept most of its ships in harbour.

==== Operation Crush ====
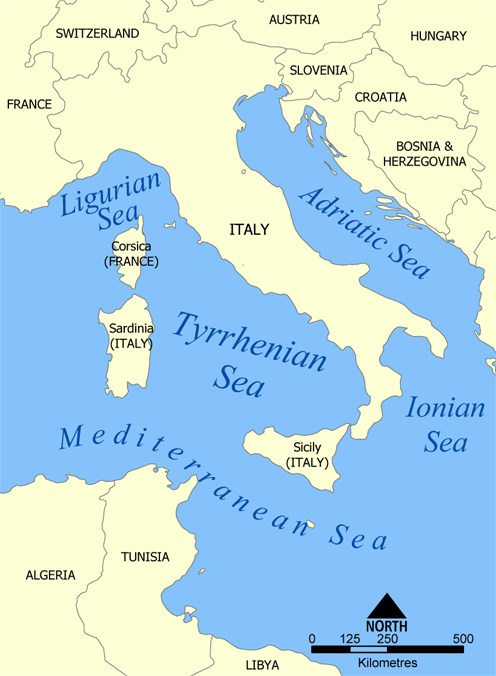
Map of the Tyrrhenian Sea, showing Sardinia and Malta

Group I, Ark Royal, Hood, the cruiser Enterprise and the destroyers Faulknor, Foxhound, Foresight and Forester detached from the main force to conduct Operation Crush, an attack on Elmas airfield at Cagliari in Sardinia as Group II, Argus, Valiant, Hotspur, Greyhound, Gallant. Escapade, Encounter and Velox continued towards the Malta flying-off point. On 2 August, at 2:30 a.m. nine Swordfish bombers and three minelayers began to take off from Ark Royal. Somerville wrote later that he watched,

...in the pitch dark... a small shadow detach itself from the great shadow of the Ark. The first Swordfish taking off. And then I thought of those incredibly gallant chaps taking off...to fly 140 miles.

A Swordfish crashed on take-off but a search by the destroyers for its crew could not find them. The rest waited until daylight then flew the 140 nmi (260 km; 160 mi) towards the target. The wind veered from south to west which ruined the flight plan, blowing the Swordfish to the south, delaying the aircraft so that they attacked in daylight, rather than at dawn. The Italian anti-aircraft fire was intense and damaged one Swordfish which made an emergency landing on the airfield. The two hangars were hit and set on fire, four aircraft and several buildings were destroyed. The Swordfish mine-layers dropped their mines in Cagliari harbour without loss. After the Swordfish had taken off the ships turned south to rendezvous with Group II and at 4:45 a.m. swordfish were sent eastwqards to search for the Italian ships reported to have sailed north through the Straits of Messina and south-south-east to find Group II; Nine Skuas flew overhead to protect the fleet and the Swordfish returning from Cagliari.

==== Operation Spark ====
At 8:30 p.m. Enterprise departed from Group I to carry out Operation Spark, a wireless deception to the north of Minorca. Two aircraft were reported overhead and the ruse was considered a success. Somerville ordered Enterprise to search for a French steamer Gouverneur-Général de Gueydon bound for Marseille from Algiers, carrying Édouard Daladier, the French prime minister, 1938 – 20 May 1940. Daladier had tried to rally French resistance in North Africa, only to have been taken prisoner. After failing to find the French ship Somerville ordered Enterprise to return direct to Gibraltar rather than risk being caught isolated. (Note: On his return to metropolitan France, Daladier was imprisoned in the Buchenwald and Dachau concentration camps until the liberation of 1945.)

=== 1–4 August ===
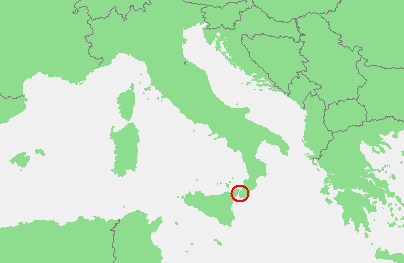
Location map of the Straits of Messina

On 1 August, the British submarine HMS Oswald, on patrol south of the Straits of Messina, reported cruisers and destroyers sailing north through the strait but Somerville had chosen to keep to the plan. After the take-off, Group I had changed course to rendezvous with Group II, joining soon after Argus had flown-off the Hurricanes and Skuas. A westerly wind increased, a headwind which slowed the Swordfish returning from Cagliari. Visibility deteriorated and the cloud base dropped to 4,000 ft (1,200 m) but the Swordfish landed between 6:30 and 7:20 a.m. An Italian submarine was spotted near the fleet.

At 9:30 a.m. Arethusa was sent to intercept the French ship Gouveneur-Général de Gueydon but found nothing, despite reconnaissance flights by four Swordfish from Ark Royal. The Swordfish and Skuas flew all day, forming an anti-submarine screen and providing fighter cover. At noon, a CANT Z.506 Airone (Heron) reconnaissance aircraft was shot down by a Skua of 800 NAS. Late in the morning the radar apparatus on Valiant detected bombers to the north, which turned away, 10 nmi (19 km; 12 mi) short of Force H. By the afternoon of 4 August the ships were back in Gibraltar.

== Aftermath ==
=== Analysis ===
A squadron of Hurricane aircraft had reinforced Malta, Elmas airfield had been bombed and Italian bombers had been deterred by anti-aircraft fire and the Skuas of Ark Royal. Attacks on the Italian mainland had been shown to be possible and the Regia Aeronautica had been found to be less formidable than had been feared. The training of Force H instituted by Somerville had been a success and Force H had begun to establish itself in the Mediterranean. Operation Hurry, the first Club Run to reinforce the RAF on Malta, had succeeded..

=== Casualties ===
The British suffered the loss of two Swordfish aircraft, one crew being killed and the other taken prisoner. Four Italian aircraft were destroyed on the ground at Elmas airfield near Cagliari in Sardinia and two bombers were shot down by the Skuas of Ark Royal, with no survivors.

== Orders of battle ==
=== Britain to Gibraltar ===
Ocean escort
Ship	Flag	Type	Notes
HMS Argus	Royal Navy	Aircraft carrier	
HMS Encounter	Royal Navy	E-class destroyer	
HMS Gallant	Royal Navy	G-class destroyer	
HMS Greyhound	Royal Navy	G-class destroyer	
HMS Hotspur	Royal Navy	H-class destroyer	

=== Force H ===
Group I
Operation Crush
Ship	Flag	Type	Notes
HMS Ark Royal	Royal Navy	Aircraft carrier	
HMS Hood	Royal Navy	Admiral-class battlecruiser	
HMS Enterprise	Royal Navy	Emerald-class cruiser	Operation Spark
HMS Faulknor	Royal Navy	F-class destroyer	
HMS Foresight	Royal Navy	F-class destroyer	
HMS Forester	Royal Navy	F-class destroyer	
HMS Foxhound	Royal Navy	F-class destroyer	
Group I (det.)
Operation Spark
HMS Enterprise	Royal Navy	Emerald-class cruiser	Wireless deception
Group II
Operation Hurry
HMS Argus	Royal Navy	1918 ocean liner conversion	
HMS Resolution	Royal Navy	Revenge-class battleship	
HMS Valiant	Royal Navy	Queen Elizabeth-class battleship	
HMS Arethusa	Royal Navy	Arethusa-class cruiser	
HMS Delhi	Royal Navy	Danae-class cruiser	
HMS Active	Royal Navy	A-class destroyer	
HMS Encounter	Royal Navy	E-class destroyer	
HMS Escapade	Royal Navy	E-class destroyer	
HMS Gallant	Royal Navy	G-class destroyer	
HMS Greyhound	Royal Navy	G-class destroyer	
HMS Hotspur	Royal Navy	H-class destroyer	
HMS Velox	Royal Navy	V-class destroyer	

=== Regia Marina ===
Off Cap Bougaroûn
Ship	Flag	Type	Notes
Axum	Kingdom of Italy	Adua-class submarine	
Neghelli	Kingdom of Italy	Adua-class submarine	
Scirè	Kingdom of Italy	Adua-class submarine	
Argo	Kingdom of Italy	Argo-class submarine	
Medusa	Kingdom of Italy	Argonauta-class submarine	
Luciano Manara	Kingdom of Italy	Bandiera-class submarine	
Diaspro	Kingdom of Italy	Perla-class submarine	
Turchese	Kingdom of Italy	Perla-class submarine	
