= Italian submarine Turchese =

Italian submarine

History

Kingdom of Italy
- Name: Turchese
- Namesake: Turquoise
- Builder: CRDA, Monfalcone
- Laid down: 28 September 1935
- Launched: 19 July 1936
- Commissioned: 21 September 1936
- Fate: Struck, 1 February 1948

General characteristics
- Class & type: Perla-class submarine
- Displacement: 626.115 tonnes (616 long tons) standard; 700.54 tonnes (689 long tons) normal (surfaced); 859.69 tonnes (846 long tons) normal (submerged)
- Length: 60.18 m (197 ft 5 in)
- Beam: 6.454 m (21 ft 2.1 in)
- Draft: 4.709 m (15 ft 5.4 in)
- Installed power: 1,350 hp (1,010 kW) (diesels); 800 hp (600 kW) (electric motors)
- Propulsion: Diesel-electric; 2 × CRDA diesel engines; 2 × CRDA electric engines
- Speed: 14 knots (26 km/h; 16 mph) surfaced; 7.5 knots (13.9 km/h; 8.6 mph) submerged
- Range: 5,200 nmi (9,600 km; 6,000 mi) at 8 knots (15 km/h; 9.2 mph) surfaced; 74 nmi (137 km; 85 mi) at 4 knots (7.4 km/h; 4.6 mph) submerged
- Test depth: 80 m (260 ft)
- Complement: 44 (4 officers + 40 non-officers and sailors)
- Armament: 6 × 533 mm (21 in) torpedo tubes (4 bow, 2 stern); 1 × 100 mm (4 in) / 47 caliber deck gun; 2 x 1 – 13.2 mm (0.52 in) anti-aircraft guns

Italian submarine Turchese was a Perla-class submarine built for the Royal Italian Navy (Regia Marina) during the 1930s. She was named after a gemstone Turquoise.

== Design and description ==
The Perla-class submarines were essentially repeats of the preceding Sirena class. The modifications that were made compared to the boats of the previous series were mostly of upgrade nature. Among them there was the enlargement of the conning tower at the top, more modern engines, installation of a radiogoniometer that could be controlled from inside the boat. Improvements and the installation of new air conditioning equipment meant a slight increase in displacement, and increase in the fuel stowage also increased the autonomy of these boats compared to the previous series. Their designed full load displacement was 695 metric tons (684 long tons) surfaced and 855 metric tons (841 long tons) submerged, but varied somewhat depending on the boat and the builder. The submarines were 197 feet 6 inches (60.20 m) long, had a beam of 21 feet (6.4 m) and a draft of 15 feet (4.6 m) to 15 feet 5 inches (4.70 m).

For surface running, the boats were powered by two diesel engines, each driving one propeller shaft with overall power of 675–750 hp (503–559 kW). When submerged each propeller was driven by a 400-horsepower (298 kW) electric motor. They could reach 14 knots (26 km/h; 16 mph) on the surface and 7.5 knots (13.9 km/h; 8.6 mph) underwater. On the surface, the Perla class had a range of 5,200 nautical miles (9,600 km; 6,000 mi) at 8 knots (15 km/h; 9.2 mph), submerged, they had a range of 74 nmi (137 km; 85 mi) at 4 knots (7.4 km/h; 4.6 mph).

The boats were armed with six internal 53.3 cm (21.0 in) torpedo tubes, four in the bow and two in the stern. One reload torpedo was carried for each tube, for a total of twelve. They were also armed with one 100 mm (4 in) deck gun for combat on the surface. The light anti-aircraft armament consisted of one or two pairs of 13.2 mm (0.52 in) machine guns.

== Construction and career ==
Turchese was built by CRDA at their shipyard in Monfalcone, laid on 28 September 1935, launched on 19 July 1936, and completed on 21 September 1936.

After delivery, Turchese was assigned to the 34th Squadron (III Submarine group) based at Messina. After brief training, she carried out a long endurance cruise in the Dodecanese in the fall of 1936. In 1937 she carried out a training campaign in the Dodecanese and the Mediterranean, followed by another one in 1938. On October 15, 1938, she was temporarily assigned to Flotilla Submarine school. In 1939 Turchese returned to active duty, and formed the 72nd Squadron (VII Submarine Group) based at Cagliari together with Diaspro, Corallo and Medusa. Turchese remained assigned to this Squadron until the end of her career.

After the outbreak of hostilities Turchese was under command of Gustavo Miniero. She carried out her first war mission in patrol off Cap de Creus June 17–19, 1940 without sighting any enemy ships.

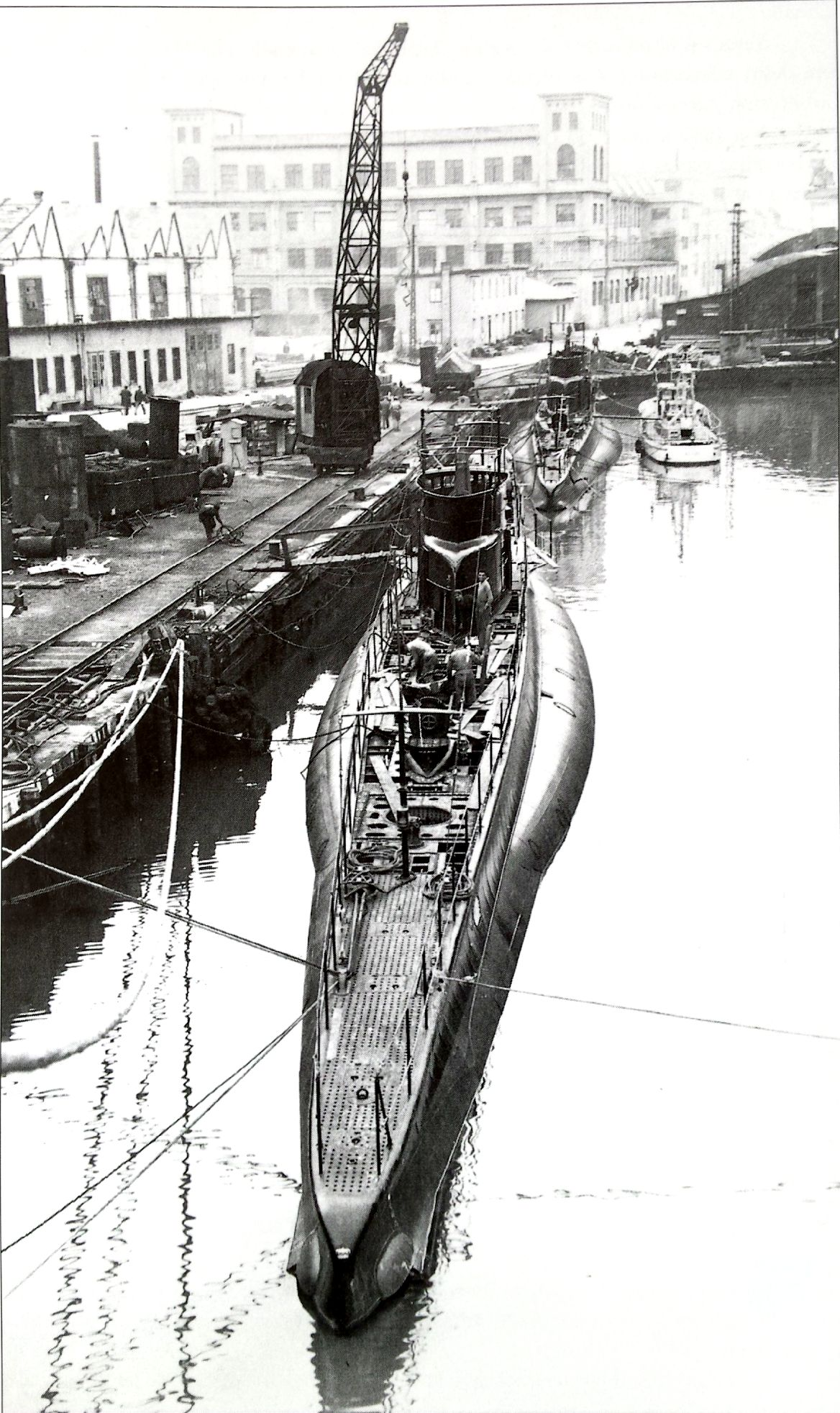
Turchese at Monfalcone

During her war career Turchese conducted many uneventful patrols in the Strait of Sicily and near the North African coast.

On July 7, 1940 Turchese together with 5 other submarines, including Ascianghi and Axum, was assigned to patrol and area south of Sardinia. On July 12, 1940, on her return journey to Cagliari, she sighted an enemy ship which appeared to be laying mines, and launched three torpedoes at the target. One torpedo missed, and the other two passed under the hull of the ship without exploding, while the ship moved away at full speed.

On August 1, 1940 Turchese together with Scirè, Argo, Neghelli, Medusa (later replaced by Luciano Manara), Axum and Diaspro was sent to form a barrier north of Cape Bougaroun following departure from Gibraltar of the British Force H. There were ongoing British operations "Crush" and "Hurry" in progress at this time. Italian submarines stayed on patrol until August 9, however, Force H passed north of the area patrolled by Italian submarines, and they were not able to detect it.

December 31, 1940 – January 12, 1941 Turchese was deployed on patrol in the Strait of Otranto along with Ambra and Filippo Corridoni to protect traffic between Italy and Albania.

In September 1941 during British operation "Halberd" she was deployed south-southwest of Ibiza along with Adua and Dandolo.

On October 17, 1941, along with the Serpente, Alagi and Diaspro she was deployed to patrol an area north of Cap de Fer.

On November 10, 1941, she was sent to patrol the waters east of Gibraltar, along with Aradam, Squalo, Narvalo, Onice and Fratelli Bandiera.

In the morning of October 28, 1942 Turchese was deployed along with Brin, Corallo, Emo, Topazio and Axum south of the Balearic Islands with the task of intercepting part of Force H which left Gibraltar participating in British Operation "Baritone". Submarines did not, however, sight any British vessels that took a different path and then returned to the base.

On November 8, 1942 Operation Torch was launched: more than 500 British and American vessels escorted by 350 warships began landing 107,000 troops on the coasts of Algeria and Morocco, thus opening the second front in North Africa. Together with many other Italian and German submarines Turchese was immediately dispatched to the southern Mediterranean.

On September 7, 1943, under the provisions of Zeta Plan, many Italian submarines were deployed in the Tyrrhenian Sea to intercept an anticipated Anglo-American landing in southern Italy. Turchese patrolled in an area between the Gulf of Gaeta and the Gulf of Paola.

The following day, following the proclamation of the Armistice, Turchese was instructed to sail to Bona, Algeria to surrender to the Allies. At 21:27 on September 11, however, she was attacked by a German aircraft and hit, sustaining serious damage, so that she had to be towed by a British vessel. She arrived in tow at Bona on September 13, 1943.

After doing temporary repairs, she left Bona in the afternoon of September 27, but shortly thereafter her engines stopped working and the submarine had to turn back and arrived at Bona at 7:30 the following day. From there Turchese went to Bizerta and then to Malta, where she arrived on October 6.

On November 27, 1943 Turchese left Malta towed by corvette Chimera, first coming to Augusta then to Taranto, and finally to Brindisi.

Turchese never returned to service and spent the rest of the conflict disarmed in Brindisi. She was struck on February 1, 1948, and subsequently scrapped.
