= Acciaio =

Acciaio (/atˈt͡ʃa.jo/) means steel in Italian. It may also refer to:

- Steel (1933 film)
- Steel (2012 film)
- Italian submarine Acciaio
