= Italian submarine Neghelli =

Adua-class submarine

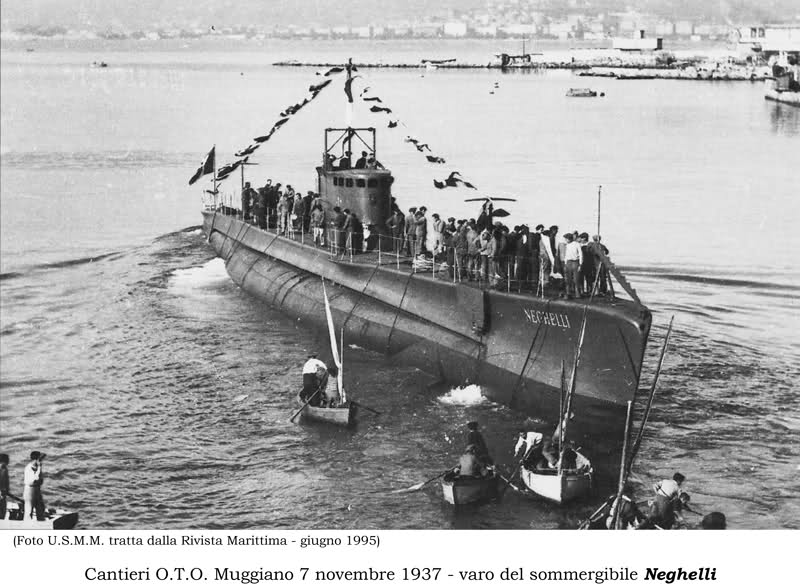
- RIN Neghelli

History

Kingdom of Italy
- Name: Neghelli
- Namesake: Negele
- Builder: OTO
- Laid down: 25 February 1937
- Launched: 7 November 1937
- Commissioned: 28 February 1938
- Fate: Sunk, 19 January 1941

General characteristics
- Class & type: 600-Serie Adua-class submarine
- Displacement: 680 long tons (691 t) surfaced; 844 long tons (858 t) submerged
- Length: 60.18 m (197 ft 5 in)
- Beam: 6.45 m (21 ft 2 in)
- Draft: 4.7 m (15 ft 5 in)
- Installed power: 1,200 bhp (890 kW) (diesels); 800 hp (600 kW) (electric motors)
- Propulsion: Diesel-electric; 2 × FIAT diesel engines; 2 × Marelli electric motors
- Speed: 14 knots (26 km/h; 16 mph) surfaced; 7.5 knots (13.9 km/h; 8.6 mph) submerged
- Range: 3,180 nmi (5,890 km; 3,660 mi) at 10.5 knots (19.4 km/h; 12.1 mph) surfaced; 74 nmi (137 km; 85 mi) at 4 knots (7.4 km/h; 4.6 mph) submerged
- Test depth: 80 m (260 ft)
- Complement: 44 (4 officers + 40 non-officers and sailors)
- Armament: 6 × 533 mm (21 in) torpedo tubes (4 bow, 2 stern); 1 × 100 mm (4 in) / 47 caliber deck gun; 2 x 1 – 13.2 mm (0.52 in) anti-aircraft guns

Italian submarine Neghelli was an Adua-class submarine built for the Royal Italian Navy (Regia Marina) during the 1930s. It was named after a town of Negele in Ethiopia.

== Design and description ==
The Adua-class submarines were essentially repeats of the preceding Perla class. They displaced 680 long tons (690 t) surfaced and 844 long tons (858 t) submerged. The submarines were 60.18 meters (197 ft 5 in) long, had a beam of 6.45 meters (21 ft 2 in) and a draft of 4.7 meters (15 ft 5 in).

For surface running, the boats were powered by two 600-brake-horsepower (447 kW) diesel engines, each driving one propeller shaft. When submerged each propeller was driven by a 400-horsepower (298 kW) electric motor. They could reach 14 knots (26 km/h; 16 mph) on the surface and 7.5 knots (13.9 km/h; 8.6 mph) underwater. On the surface, the Adua class had a range of 3,180 nautical miles (5,890 km; 3,660 mi) at 10.5 knots (19.4 km/h; 12.1 mph), submerged, they had a range of 74 nmi (137 km; 85 mi) at 4 knots (7.4 km/h; 4.6 mph).

The boats were armed with six internal 53.3 cm (21.0 in) torpedo tubes, four in the bow and two in the stern. They were also armed with one 100 mm (4 in) deck gun for combat on the surface. The light anti-aircraft armament consisted of one or two pairs of 13.2 mm (0.52 in) machine guns.

== Construction and career ==
Neghelli was launched on 7 November 1937 in OTO's shipyard in La Spezia and commissioned on 28 February 1938. After an endurance training in the Dodecanese, Neghelli was assigned to Leros. In May of 1940 she was reassigned to 15th Squadron (I Submarine Group) based at La Spezia. Her commander at the time was Carlo Ferracuti.

At the outbreak of hostilities she immediately was sent on a mission to the west part of the Gulf of Genoa and returned on 14 June 1940 without encountering any enemy traffic.

On 1 August 1940 Neghelli together with Scirè, Argo, Turchese, Medusa (later replaced by Luciano Manara), Axum and Diaspro was sent to form a barrier north of Cape Bougaroun following departure from Gibraltar of the British Force H. There were ongoing British operations "Crush" and "Hurry" in progress at this time. Italian submarines stayed on patrol until 9 August, however, Force H passed north of the area patrolled by Italian submarines, and they were not able to detect it. On 5 August 1940 at approximately 18:50 Neghelli, while located west of Asinara, was attacked by an enemy submarine. Neghelli managed to avoid two torpedoes by maneuvering.

In December 1940 she was sent on a new mission to patrol an area 45 miles north of Marsa Matruh until Christmas. Two more submarines, Naiade and Narvalo, were also deployed in the same area to intercept British naval forces sent to attack Italian ports on the coast of Cyrenaica.

On 13 December 1940, at 20:22 while patrolling on the surface in an area 45 miles north of Marsa Matruh in the position 32°37′N 26°44′E, she sighted a British cruiser thought to be HMS Southampton. Neghelli closed in and at 20:36 fired a spread of four torpedoes, stayed on the surface to observe the results. One torpedo hit the target, which turned out to be HMS Coventry. The cruiser opened fire in the direction of the submarine, forcing her to dive and move away. HMS Coventry was damaged and was forced to return to Alexandria for repairs which lasted until 20 January 1941 and didn't return to action until late March 1941.

Neghelli's heroics were reported in the war bulletin no. 191 of 15 December 1940, claiming the sinking of the British cruiser. Captain Ferracuti was decorated with a Silver Medal of Military Valor for this attack.

On 14 January 1941 Neghelli departed from Leros for an offensive mission targeting traffic in and out of Piraeus. No news was heard from her since the departure. From the British documents released after the war, it appears that on 19 January 1941 Neghelli first attacked Greek destroyer Psara early in the morning, then at 11:53 she attacked British convoy AS-12 heading from Piraeus to Alexandria. Convoy AS-12 was composed of steamers Clan Cumming, Clan MacDonald and Empire Song escorted by the anti-aircraft cruiser HMS Calcutta, destroyers HMS Greyhound, HMS Janus, and HMS Defender. One of Neghelli 's torpedoes struck the steamer Clan Cumming (7264 GRT) in the position 37°15′N 24°04′E, near the San Giorgio island, causing serious damage and forcing her to return to Piraeus escorted by HMS Janus. The remaining destroyers counterattacked with depth charges, and finally HMS Greyhound was able to hit the submarine, which sank with all hands 40 miles northeast of Falkonera.
