= Italian ship Nautilus =

Nautilus was the name of at least two ships of the Italian Navy and may refer to:

- Italian submarine Nautilus, a Nautilus-class submarine launched in 1913 and discarded in 1919.
- Nautilus was also the name given to the Argonauta-class submarine Serpente on ordering.
