= Neghelli =

Neghelli may refer to:

- Negele Borana, a town in southern Ethiopia
- Italian submarine Neghelli
