= Italian submarine Acciaio =

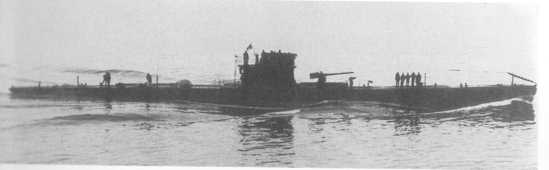
- Acciaio

History

Italy
- Name: Acciaio
- Builder: OTO
- Laid down: 21 November 1940
- Launched: 22 January 1941
- Commissioned: 30 October 1941
- Fate: Sunk, 13 July 1943

General characteristics
- Class & type: Acciaio-class submarine
- Displacement: 697 tonnes (686 long tons) surfaced; 850 tonnes (837 long tons) submerged
- Length: 60.18 m (197 ft 5 in)
- Beam: 6.44 m (21 ft 2 in)
- Draft: 4.78 m (15 ft 8 in)
- Installed power: 1,400 bhp (1,000 kW) (diesels); 800 hp (600 kW) (electric motors)
- Propulsion: Diesel-electric; 2 × diesel engines; 2 × electric motors
- Speed: 14 knots (26 km/h; 16 mph) surfaced; 7.7 knots (14.3 km/h; 8.9 mph) submerged
- Range: 5,000 nmi (9,300 km; 5,800 mi) at 8.5 knots (15.7 km/h; 9.8 mph) surfaced; 80 nmi (150 km; 92 mi) at 3 knots (5.6 km/h; 3.5 mph) submerged
- Test depth: 80 m (260 ft)
- Complement: 48
- Armament: 6 × 533 mm (21 in) torpedo tubes (4 bow, 2 stern); 1 × 100 mm (4 in) / 47 caliber deck gun; 1 or 2 × 20 mm (0.79 in) anti-aircraft guns

The Italian submarine Acciaio was the name ship of her class of submarines built for the Royal Italian Navy (Regia Marina) during World War II.

== Design and description ==
The Acciaio-class submarines were designed as improved versions of the preceding Adua class. They displaced 697 metric tons (686 long tons) surfaced and 850 metric tons (840 long tons) submerged. The submarines were 60.18 meters (197 ft 5 in) long, had a beam of 6.44 meters (21 ft 2 in) and a draft of 4.78 meters (15 ft 8 in).

For surface running, the boats were powered by two 700-brake-horsepower (522 kW) diesel engines, each driving one propeller shaft. When submerged each propeller was driven by a 400-horsepower (298 kW) electric motor. They could reach 14 knots (26 km/h; 16 mph) on the surface and 7.3 knots (13.5 km/h; 8.4 mph) underwater. On the surface, the Acciaio class had a range of 5,000 nautical miles (9,300 km; 5,800 mi) at 8.5 knots (15.7 km/h; 9.8 mph), submerged, they had a range of 80 nmi (150 km; 92 mi) at 3 knots (5.6 km/h; 3.5 mph).

The boats were armed with six internal 53.3 cm (21.0 in) torpedo tubes, four in the bow and two in the stern. They were also armed with one 100 mm (4 in) deck gun for combat on the surface. The light anti-aircraft armament varied and could consist of one or two 20-millimeter (0.79 in) or one or two pairs of 13.2 mm (0.52 in) machine guns.

== Construction and career ==
Acciaio was built in OTO's shipyard at Muggiano. She was laid down on 21 November 1940 and launched on 22 January 1941. She was commissioned on 30 October of the same year. The name Acciaio means "Steel" in Italian. The boat’s first patrol was on 29 March 1942 and she carried out nine offensive patrols during her service career, against Allied naval forces in the Mediterranean. She had one success, when she sank the British armed trawler Tervani on 7 February 1943 off the Algerian coast. Her last patrol was on 10 July from La Maddalena to act against Allied forces involved in Operation Husky, the invasion of Sicily. On 13 July 1943, Acciaio was sunk by the British submarine Unruly with the loss of her entire crew of 46.
