= Italian submarine Narvalo (1906) =

Glauco-class submarine of the Royal Italian Navy

History

Italy
- Name: Narvalo
- Namesake: Narwhal
- Builder: Regio Arsenale, Venice
- Laid down: 9 February 1905
- Launched: 21 October 1906
- Completed: 16 May 1907
- Decommissioned: 26 September 1918
- Fate: Stricken 26 September 1918

General characteristics
- Class & type: Glauco-class submarine
- Displacement: 160 t (157 long tons) (surfaced); 243 t (239 long tons) (submerged)
- Length: 36.8 m (121 ft)
- Beam: 4.32 m (14 ft 2 in)
- Draft: 2.5 m (8 ft)
- Installed power: 600 bhp (450 kW) (diesels); 170 bhp (130 kW) (electric motors)
- Propulsion: 2 shafts; diesel-electric; 2 × diesel engines; 2 × electric motors
- Speed: 13 knots (24 km/h; 15 mph) (surfaced); 6.2 knots (11.5 km/h; 7.1 mph) (submerged)
- Range: 150 nmi (280 km; 170 mi) at 13 knots (24 km/h; 15 mph) (surfaced); 18 nmi (33 km; 21 mi) at 6 knots (11 km/h; 6.9 mph) (submerged)
- Test depth: 25 m (82 ft)
- Complement: 15
- Armament: 2 × 450 mm (18 in) torpedo tubes (2 bow)
- Notes: Motto (Latin): Silenter sub undis victoriam parat ("Silently preparing the victory under the waves")

Narvalo was one of five Glauco-class submarines built for the Regia Marina (Royal Italian Navy) during the early 1900s. The boat served in World War I with defensive purposes and was demolished in 1918.

== Design ==
The Glauco class of small submarines, designed by Cesare Laurenti, was the first class of submarines to be built for the Italian Navy, following the 1890 experimental submarine Delfino. They were 36.84 m (120 ft 10 in) long, with a beam of 4.32 m (14 ft 2 in) and a draft of 2.66 m (8 ft 9 in). The submarines of the class displaced 157–161 t (155–158 long tons) on the surface and 240–244 t (236–240 long tons) submerged. Narvalo was powered by two Fiat petrol engines on the surface, rated at 600 bhp (450 kW) and two electric motors rated at 170 hp (130 kW) while submerged, giving a speed of 13 knots (24 km/h; 15 mph) on the surface and 6 kn (11 km/h; 6.9 mph) underwater. Range was 900 nautical miles (1,700 km; 1,000 mi) at 8 knots (15 km/h; 9.2 mph) on the surface and 40 nautical miles (74 km; 46 mi) at 4 knots (7.4 km/h; 4.6 mph).

Narvalo was armed with two 450 mm (17.7 in) torpedo tubes. The submarine's crew was 2 officers and 13 other ranks.

== Construction and career ==
Narvalo, named for the Narwhal, was laid down on 9 February 1905 and launched on 21 October 1906 at the Regio Arsenale (Navy shipyard)at Venice. She was completed on 16 May 1907, as a training ship in the Adriatic Sea.

With the start of the First World War for Italy the submarine was stationed at Brindisi and placed within the IV Submarine Squadron, with Lieutenant Ottavio Siccoli as commander. It was used in a defensive function.

In 1918 the ship was transferred to Porto Corsini and later, with the end of the war, went into reserve and was demolished.

Throughout the war, the Narvalo had carried out a total of 65 defensive ambush missions a short distance from the coast, for a total of 436 hours of surface navigation and 268 hours under water.

== Bibliography ==
- Favre, Franco (2008). La Marina nella Grande Guerra. Le operazioni aeree, navali, subacquee e terrestri in Adriatico (in Italian). Gaspari Editore. ISBN 978-88-7541-135-0.
- Fraccaroli, Aldo (1970). Italian Warships of World War II. London: Ian Allan. ISBN 0-7110-0105-7.
- Gardiner, Robert; Gray, Randal, eds. (1985). Conway's All The World's Fighting Ships 1906–1921. London: Conway Maritime Press. ISBN 0-85177-245-5.
