= Italian submarine Delfino =

Delfino is the name of two submarines of the Italian Navy, and may refer to:

- Italian submarine Delfino (1890), a pioneering submarine completed in 1892 and commissioned in 1895, which saw action in the First World War and was stricken in 1919
- Italian submarine Delfino (1930), a Squalo-class submarine completed in 1931, which saw action in the Second World War and was lost accidentally in 1943
