= Acciaio-class submarine =

Italian submarine class

- Italian Acciaio-class submarine (Porfido)

Class overview
- Name: Acciaio class
- Builders: Odero Terni Orlando (OTO), Muggiano; Cantieri Riuniti dell' Adriatico (CRDA), Monfalcone; Tosi, Taranto
- Operators: Regia Marina
- Preceded by: Adua class
- Succeeded by: end of 600 series
- In commission: 1941–1966
- Completed: 13
- Lost: 8

General characteristics
- Type: Submarine
- Displacement: 697 long tons (708 t) surfaced; 850 long tons (864 t) submerged
- Length: 60.18 m (197 ft 5 in)
- Beam: 6.44 m (21 ft 2 in)
- Draught: 4.78 m (15 ft 8 in)
- Propulsion: 2 diesel engines, 1,400 hp (1,000 kW); 2 electric motors, 800 bhp (600 kW)
- Speed: 14 knots (26 km/h; 16 mph) surfaced; 7.7 knots (14.3 km/h; 8.9 mph) submerged
- Range: 3,180 nmi (5,890 km) at 10.5 kn (19.4 km/h) surfaced
- Test depth: 80 m (260 ft)
- Complement: 45
- Armament: 1 × 100 mm (4 in) / 47 caliber deck gun; 1-2 × 20mm/70 AA; 6 × 533 mm (21 in) torpedo tubes (4 forward, 2 aft); 12 × torpedoes

The Acciaio-class submarine (also sometimes called Platino class) was the fifth subclass of the 600 Series of coastal submarines built by the Regia Marina. They were completed during the early 1940s and saw service in World War II.

== Design and description ==
The Acciaios were a development of the Adua and Perla designs, with some improvements, such as a lower conning tower to improve stability and reduce the silhouette. Of the 13 vessels in the class, six were built by CRDA at Monfalcone, four by OTO at Muggiano, and three by Cantieri Tosi in Taranto, the three main Italian shipyards for submarines. They were single-hulled with side tanks, and built to a Bernardis design, though the Tosi vessels had more powerful engines (at the expense of the two stern torpedo tubes), giving a surface speed of 14.7 knots (27.2 km/h; 16.9 mph).

The word Acciaio means "steel", and all vessels in this class were named for metals and minerals.

== Ships ==
List of Acciaio-class submarines
Ship	Builder	Launched	Fate
Acciaio	OTO	20 July 1941	torpedoed 13 July 1943 by HMS Unruly
Alabastro	CRDA	18 December 41	bombed 14 September 1942 by Allied aircraft
Argento	Tosi	22 February 1942	sunk 3 August 1943 by USS Buck
Asteria	CRDA	25 June 1941	sunk 17 February 1943 by HMS Easton, HMS Wheatland,
Avorio	CRDA	6 September 1941	sunk 8 February 1943 by HMCS Regina
Bronzo	Tosi	28 September 1941	captured 12 July 1943 by British destroyers
Cobalto	OTO	20 July 1941	rammed 12 August 1942 by HMS Ithuriel
Giada	CRDA	10 July 1941	surrendered at armistice September 1943
Granito	CRDA	7 August 1941	torpedoed 9 November 1942 by HMS Saracen
Nichelio	OTO	12 April 1942	surrendered at armistice September 1943
Platino	OTO	1 June 1941	surrendered at armistice September 1943
Porfido	CRDA	23 August 1941	torpedoed 6 December 1942 by HMS Tigris
Volframio	Tosi	9 November 1941	scuttled at armistice September 1943; raised by Germans, sunk in Allied air raid 1944

== Service ==
Of the 13 vessels completed, eight were lost in action. The submarines served in the Mediterranean.

== See also ==
- Italian submarines of World War II
