= Italian submarine Narvalo =

Narvalo was the name of at least two ships of the Italian Navy and may refer to:

- Italian submarine Narvalo (1906), a Glauco-class submarine launched in 1906 and discarded in 1918.
- Italian submarine Narvalo (1930), a Squalo-class submarine launched in 1930 and lost in 1943.
