= Italian submarine Adua =

Italian submarine

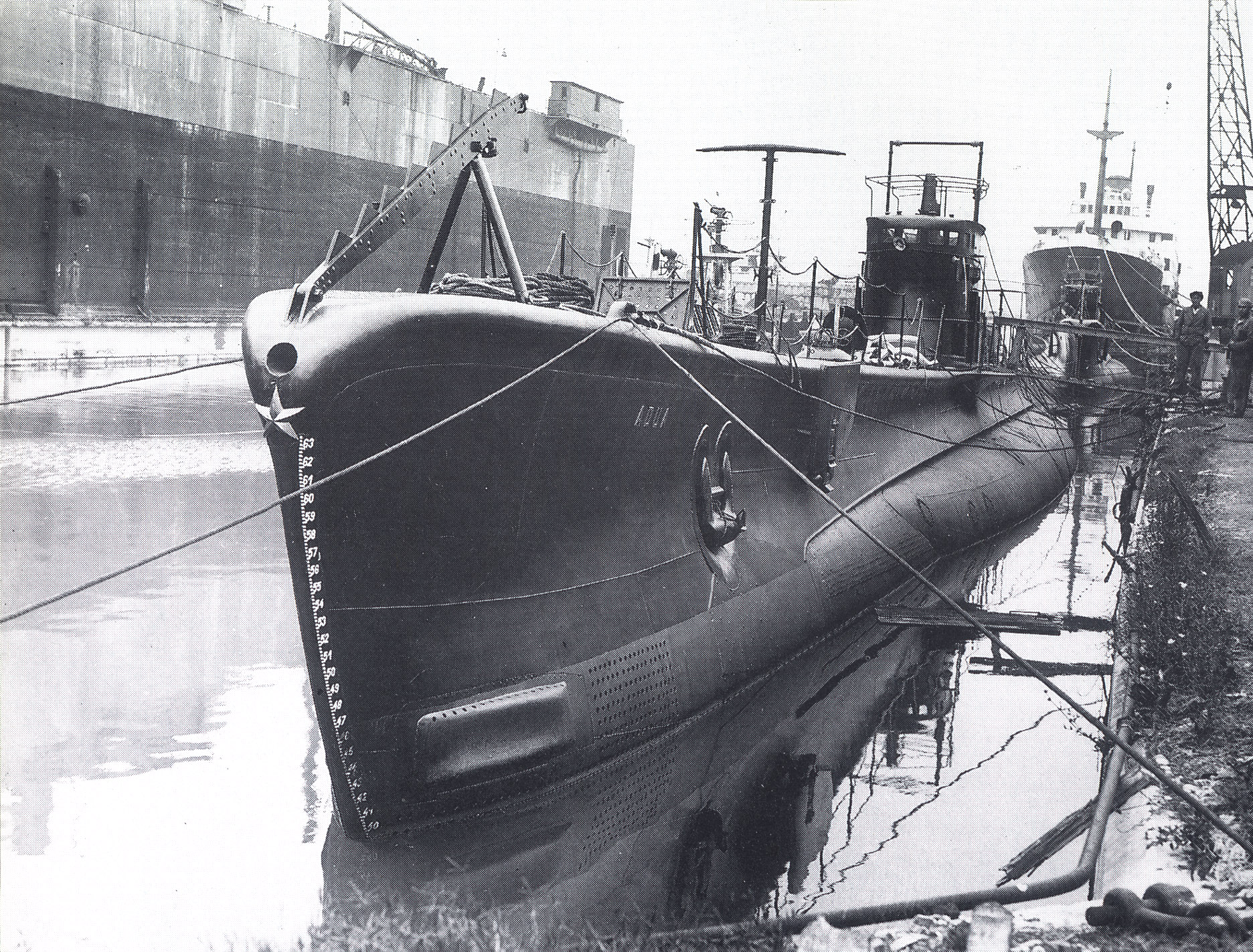
- Adua

History

Kingdom of Italy
- Name: Adua
- Namesake: Adwa
- Builder: CRDA, Monfalcone
- Laid down: 1 February 1936
- Launched: 13 September 1936
- Commissioned: 14 November 1936
- Fate: Sunk 30 September 1941

General characteristics
- Class & type: Adua-class submarine
- Displacement: 680 long tons (691 t) surfaced; 844 long tons (858 t) submerged
- Length: 60.18 m (197 ft 5 in)
- Beam: 6.45 m (21 ft 2 in)
- Draught: 4.6 m (15 ft 1 in)
- Propulsion: 2 CRDA diesel engines; 2 CRDA electric engines
- Speed: 14 knots (26 km/h; 16 mph) surfaced; 7.5 knots (13.9 km/h; 8.6 mph) submerged
- Range: 3,180 nmi (5,890 km) at 10.5 kn (19.4 km/h) surfaced; 74 nmi (137 km) at 4 kn (7.4 km/h) submerged; 7.5 nmi (13.9 km) at 7.5 kn (13.9 km/h) submerged
- Test depth: 80 m (260 ft)
- Complement: 44 (4 officers, 40 non-officers and sailors)
- Armament: 1 × 100 mm (4 in) / 47 caliber deck gun; 2 x 1 – 13.2mm Breda machine guns; 6 × 533 mm (21 in) torpedo tubes (4 forward, 2 aft); 12 × torpedoes

The Italian submarine Adua was an Adua-class submarine built in the 1930s, serving in the Regia Marina during World War II. She was named after Adwa, a town in northern Ethiopia.

== Design and description ==
The Adua-class submarines were essentially repeats of the preceding Perla class. They displaced 680 long tons (690 t) surfaced and 844 long tons (858 t) submerged. The submarines were 60.18 meters (197 ft 5 in) long, had a beam of 6.45 meters (21 ft 2 in) and a draft of 4.7 meters (15 ft 5 in).

For surface running, the boats were powered by two 600-brake-horsepower (447 kW) diesel engines, each driving one propeller shaft. When submerged each propeller was driven by a 400-horsepower (298 kW) electric motor. They could reach 14 knots (26 km/h; 16 mph) on the surface and 7.5 knots (13.9 km/h; 8.6 mph) underwater. On the surface, the Adua class had a range of 3,180 nautical miles (5,890 km; 3,660 mi) at 10.5 knots (19.4 km/h; 12.1 mph), submerged, they had a range of 74 nmi (137 km; 85 mi) at 4 knots (7.4 km/h; 4.6 mph).

The boats were armed with six internal 53.3 cm (21.0 in) torpedo tubes, four in the bow and two in the stern. They were also armed with one 100 mm (4 in) deck gun for combat on the surface. The light anti-aircraft armament consisted of one or two pairs of 13.2 mm (0.52 in) machine guns.

== Construction and career ==
Adua was built at the CRDA shipyard, in Monfalcone. She was laid down on 1 February 1936, launched on 13 September of the same year, and commissioned on 14 November 1936. After intense training in the waters of the Dodecanese, Greece and Libya in 1937, Adua was assigned to the 23rd Squadron based at Naples. In 1939 she was transferred to Cagliari and became part of the 71st Squadron (VII Submarine Group).

On 10 June 1940, at the time of Italy's entrance into World War II, Adua was already at sea, south of Sardinia (between Cape Teulada and the island of La Galite). On 13 June, she moved to an area between Ibiza and Mallorca and later to the Gulf of Lion 15 miles (24 km) east of Cape Creus. During night of 17 June 1940 Adua sighted a destroyer, but could not launch an attack. The following morning, she sighted a French convoy (five merchant ships and two escorts) on the Marseille – Toulon route. Not being able to approach because of the escort, she launched a single torpedo from 1,800 meters (5,900 ft) at a larger transport. However, there are no confirmations of any ships being damaged or sunk on this day at this time and this location.

From 22 October 1940, to 12 March 1941, Adua served as the training vessel at the Pola Submarine School. During this span she carried out 46 training missions. In mid-March 1941 Adua was transferred back to Taranto. From March to May 1941 Adua was deployed in the Gulf of Taranto, and also off the coast of Greece, carrying out three unsuccessful missions:

- In March, 40 miles (64 km) west of Lefkada, then in the Gulf of Taranto;
- In April, south of Cape Krio and in Kythira Strait;
- In May, between Alexandria and Kasos Strait at first, then south of Crete.

On 10 May 1941, she was transferred to Leros. At 01:30 on 3 June 1941, she intercepted a small motor barge carrying gasoline and 72 British troops on board, including 8 officers, attempting to reach Egyptian coast. Adua took the officers prisoner, and escorted the vessel to Crete, where the other soldiers were taken prisoners. On 4 June, she headed back to Taranto where the submarine underwent a three-month long maintenance at the Arsenal of Taranto.

In the middle of September Adua operated near Menorca returning to Cagliari on 16 September. On 23 September, the submarine left Cagliari to set an ambush on the route of the British convoy to Malta (Operation Halberd) together with three other submarines. On 26 September Adua was near Cape Palos, north of Spanish city of Cartagena. The British convoy went undetected and reached Malta. The submarines, including Adua spotted and attacked British ships on their return. On 30 September 1941, at 3:50 Adua detected a group of eleven English destroyers, and attacked them with a four-torpedo salvo, but missed them and then moved north. Shortly after at 5:25, Adua sent a radio transmission to the headquarters informing them of British convoy position. She was never heard from again.

After the war, it was discovered that the submarine had been traced by two destroyers, HMS Gurkha and HMS Legion (perhaps it was the radio communication with the base that allowed British ships to locate her). After having detected Adua with ASDIC, they started depth charge attacks, and at 10:30 hit and sank Adua with all crew in the position 37°10′N 00°56′E or 36°50′N 00°56′E.
