= HMS Unruly =

U-class submarine of the Royal Navy

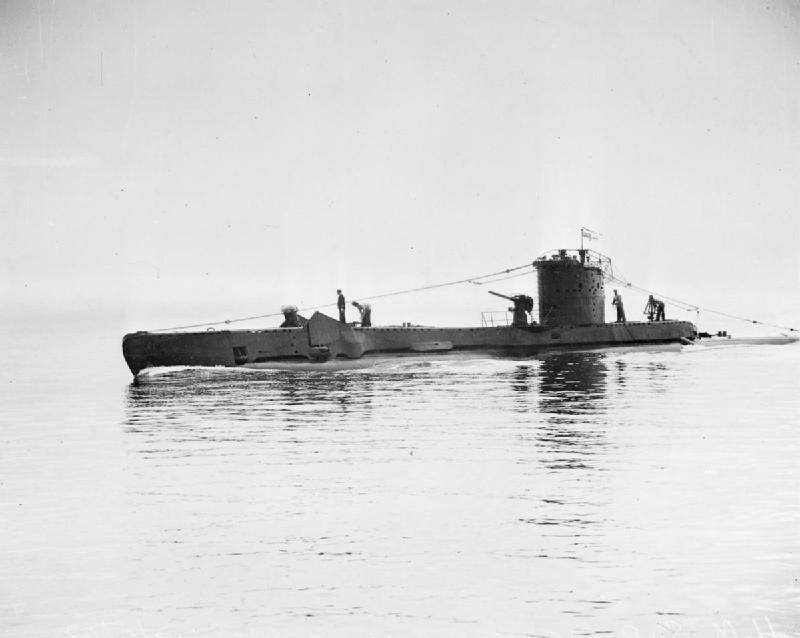
- HMS Unruly coming in from patrol at Algiers

History

United Kingdom
- Name: HMS Unruly
- Builder: Vickers-Armstrongs, Barrow-in-Furness
- Laid down: 19 November 1941
- Launched: 28 July 1942
- Commissioned: 3 November 1942
- Identification: Pennant number P49
- Fate: Scrapped February 1946

General characteristics
- Class & type: U-class submarine
- Displacement: Surfaced – 540 tons standard, 630 tons full load; Submerged – 730 tons
- Length: 58.22 m (191.0 ft)
- Beam: 4.9 m (16 ft)
- Draught: 4.62 m (15 ft 2 in)
- Propulsion: 2 shaft diesel-electric; 2 Paxman Ricardo diesel generators + electric motors; 615 hp (459 kW) / 825 hp (615 kW)
- Speed: 11.25 knots (20.84 km/h; 12.95 mph) max surfaced; 10 knots (19 km/h; 12 mph) max submerged
- Complement: 27–31
- Armament: 4 bow internal 21 inch (533 mm) torpedo tubes – 8–10 torpedoes; 1 × 3-inch (76 mm) gun

HMS Unruly was a Royal Navy U-class submarine built by Vickers-Armstrongs at Barrow-in-Furness. So far she has been the only ship of the Royal Navy to bear the name Unruly.

== Career ==
Unruly spent most of her eventful wartime career in the Mediterranean, apart from a period on convoy escort duty off the North Cape. Whilst serving in the Mediterranean, she sank the French merchant St Lucien, the Italian merchant Valentino Coda, twelve sailing vessels, including the Greek Aghios Giorgios, and the German minelayer Bulgaria. Bulgaria was loaded with supplies for the island of Kos. Unruly missed the minelayer Drache the same day. She spotted Drache several days later, but again failed to sink her.

Unruly also damaged the Italian tanker Cesco, and the Italian merchant Nicolo Tommaseo. The damaged Nicolo Tommaseo was later sunk by Allied aircraft. Unruly also launched failed attacks on the German merchants Erpel and Pelikan, and an unidentified Spanish merchant.

One of her most significant actions however, was the sinking of the Acciaio during the Allied invasion of Sicily. Unruly attacked with four torpedoes, at least one of which hit the Italian submarine, which sank her with the loss of all 46 of her crew. The crew of Unruly did not actually see the results of the attack, and initially believed they had missed and their target had escaped.

Unruly survived the war and was scrapped in February 1946 by Thos. W. Ward in Inverkeithing.
