= Italian ship Squalo =

Squalo was the name of at least three ships of the Italian Navy and may refer to:

- Italian submarine Squalo (1906), a Glauco-class submarine (1905) launched in 1906 and discarded in 1918.
- Italian submarine Squalo (1930), a Squalo-class submarine launched in 1930 and laid up in 1948.
- Italian minesweeper Squalo (M 5433), an Agile-class minesweeper built in the United States for Italy. She was launched in 1955 as MSO-518 and transferred to Italy as Squalo after completion in 1957. Decommissioned in 2000.
