= Italian submarine Axum =

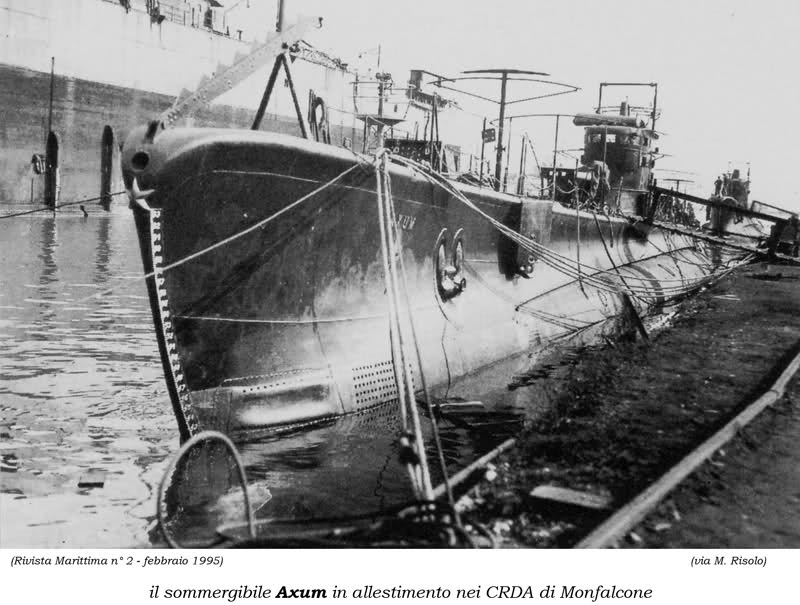
- Axum

History

Kingdom of Italy
- Name: Axum
- Namesake: Axum
- Builder: CRDA, Monfalcone
- Laid down: 8 February 1936
- Launched: 27 September 1936
- Commissioned: 2 December 1936
- Fate: Ran aground and scuttled, 28 December 1943

General characteristics
- Class & type: Adua-class submarine
- Displacement: 680 long tons (690 t) surfaced; 844 long tons (858 t) submerged
- Length: 60.18 m (197 ft 5 in)
- Beam: 6.45 m (21 ft 2 in)
- Draught: 4.6 m (15 ft 1 in)
- Propulsion: 2 CRDA diesel engines; 2 CRDA electric engines
- Speed: 14 knots (26 km/h; 16 mph) surfaced; 7.5 knots (13.9 km/h; 8.6 mph) submerged
- Range: 3,180 nmi (5,890 km; 3,660 mi) at 10.5 kn (19.4 km/h; 12.1 mph) surfaced; 74 nmi (137 km; 85 mi) at 4 kn (7.4 km/h; 4.6 mph) submerged
- Test depth: 80 m (260 ft)
- Complement: 44
- Armament: 1 × 100 mm (4 in)/47-caliber deck gun; 2 × single 13.2 mm Breda machine guns; 6 × 533 mm (21 in) torpedo tubes (4 forward, 2 aft); 12 × torpedoes

The Italian submarine Axum was an Adua-class submarine built in the 1930s, serving in the Regia Marina during World War II. She was named after an ancient city of Axum in Ethiopia.

== Design and description ==
The Adua-class submarines were essentially repeats of the preceding Perla class. They displaced 680 long tons (690 t) surfaced and 844 long tons (858 t) submerged. The submarines were 60.18 meters (197 ft 5 in) long, had a beam of 6.45 meters (21 ft 2 in) and a draft of 4.7 meters (15 ft 5 in).

For surface running, the boats were powered by two 600-brake-horsepower (447 kW) diesel engines, each driving one propeller shaft. When submerged, each propeller was driven by a 400-horsepower (298 kW) electric motor. They could reach 14 knots (26 km/h; 16 mph) on the surface and 7.5 knots (13.9 km/h; 8.6 mph) underwater. On the surface, the Adua class had a range of 3,180 nautical miles (5,890 km; 3,660 mi) at 10.5 knots (19.4 km/h; 12.1 mph), submerged, they had a range of 74 nmi (137 km; 85 mi) at 4 knots (7.4 km/h; 4.6 mph).

The boats were armed with six internal 53.3-centimeter (21.0 in) torpedo tubes, four in the bow and two in the stern. They were also armed with one 100-millimeter (4 in) deck gun for combat on the surface. The light anti-aircraft armament consisted of one or two pairs of 13.2 mm (0.52 in) machine guns.

== Construction and career ==
Axum was built at the Cantieri Riuniti dell'Adriatico (CRDA) shipyard in Monfalcone, Italy. She was laid down on 8 February 1936 and launched on 27 September of the same year. The submarine was commissioned on 2 December 1936. On 20 March 1937 after a brief training, she was assigned to 23rd Submarine Squadron in Naples. Between 27 August and 5 September she performed a secret mission on behalf of the Spanish Nationalists in the Strait of Sicily but did not detect any targets.

Between 1937 and 1940 the submarine underwent intensive training out of her base in Naples. In 1940 Axum was assigned to 71st Squadron (VII Submarine Group) headquartered at Cagliari, but her operational base continued to be Naples. After Italy's entrance into World War II she was mainly operating in the western Mediterranean Sea.

In June 1940 she was deployed south of Sardinia. On 4–5 July Axum patrolled of the coast of northern Algeria. On 9–11 July the submarine relocated to patrol off the island of La Galite, then moved southwest of the island of Sant'Antioco. In the afternoon of 9 November Axum left Cagliari and was sent to patrol off La Galite along with four other submarines (including Alagi and Aradam) as a screen to the British Operation Coat. Later the same day, shortly after 19:00, she detected engine noises but the distance was far too great to attempt an attack. On 12 November 1940, she again detected weak noises through her hydrophones, but again the distant was far too great to attempt an attack. On 27 November, while patrolling south of Sardinia, at 21:35 three destroyers were sighted and Axum submerged to avoid detection.

In January 1941 she was deployed to the coast of Algeria and Tunisia. On 16 June, Axum, was sent to patrol between Ras Uleima, and Marsa Matruh to prevent coastal bombardments by British naval ships conducted in support British troops retreat. On 20 June, the submarine received orders to move closer to Benghazi. On 23 June, around 22:26 a ship was sighted heading west and Axum launched a torpedo, but it missed due to irregular running. Axum launched a second torpedo, but it also missed the ship, passing a few meters by the stern. The ship returned fire and the submarine was forced to dive and get through a brief but intense depth charge attack, without suffering any damage. From 19 to 28 July Axum patrolled off Tobruk and detected intense aerial and naval activity, but there were no attacks.

After that Axum relocated to Leros. Upon arrival and surfacing, she was mistaken for an enemy submarine, and a MAS boat attacked her with machine guns and a torpedo. Axum suffered no damage or casualties in the encounter. Subsequently, she was transferred first to Messina, and then in September to Cagliari. That month Axum deployed to an area east of Balearic Islands and south of Menorca together with three other submarines (Aradam, Diaspro and Serpente) to intercept British ships during Operation Halberd, but British ships did not pass through her area of operation. On 24 October, Axum patrolled in the waters of Malta. In December she patrolled in the area off Cape Bougaroun.

On 4 January 1942 Axum was deployed to an area south of Malta with the task of detecting and attacking any British naval forces, but no sightings were made. In February she patrolled off the coast of Algeria. In mid-June the submarine was deployed in the Ionian Sea, then transferred to patrol northwest of Algiers. On 22 June 1942 Axum transferred to patrol off Linosa. In July Axum was on patrol between the island of Cani and La Galite, and in the late afternoon of 15 July, six miles (9.7 km) east of the Cani Island, spotted the destroyer HMS Welshman moving rapidly in the direction of Malta. At 20:00, Axum launched three electric torpedoes, but failed to hit the ship because of the bad weather and rough seas.

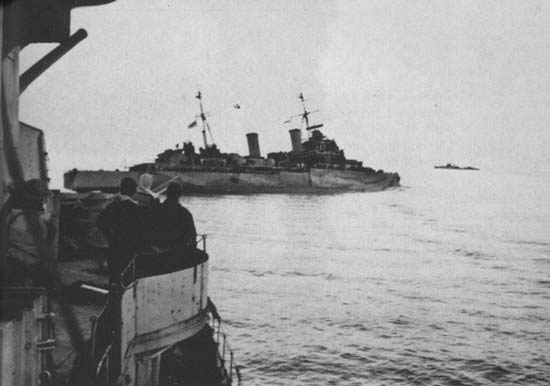
HMS Nigeria listing after being hit by Axum's torpedo

In mid-August 1942, Axum was assigned with many other submarines to intercept a British convoy, part of Operation Pedestal. Altogether, fifteen Italian submarines and two German U-boats were deployed in the western Mediterranean with the orders to attack any enemy ship greater than a destroyer. On 11 August, the submarine left Cagliari heading to an area 25 miles (40 km) northwest of Cape Blanc, arriving the following day. At 6:00 on 12 August, Axum left her assigned area, and approached Cape Blanc submerged. At 18:21 a silhouette of the convoy was observed. At 18:40 Axum observed fumes on the right which were produced by the anti-aircraft guns engaging two aircraft. Axum continued her approach, and at 19:27, observed that a convoy about 5.0 miles (8 km) to her left. At 19:37 a new observation showed that the distance had dropped to 4,000 meters (13,000 ft) , and convoy was moving at 13 knots (24 km/h; 15 mph). Another periscope observation was done at 19:48, and a cruiser was selected as a target, and at 19:55, from an estimated distance of 1,300 m (4,300 ft) from the first row of the convoy and 1,800 m (5,900 ft) from the target cruiser, Axum launched a salvo of four torpedoes: first was sent straight, second, 5° to the right, third 5° to the left, and finally last one, straight. Immediately Axum disengaged. 63 seconds after the launch, an explosion was heard, after 27 more seconds, two more, one after another. The commanding officer thought he had hit a ship in the first row and another one in the second row, but in reality three ships were hit.

The first torpedo struck the light cruiser HMS Nigeria, flagship of Admiral Harold Burrough (Commander of Force X), moving at 14 knots (26 km/h; 16 mph). The explosion opened a 30-foot (9.1 m)-wide hole, knocking out the electrical system, flooding the boiler rooms, disabling pumps, and starting fires on board. Fifty-two crew members lost their lives. The ship started listing to port, but the crew managed to stabilize the cruiser and was able to turn around and head to Gibraltar accompanied by three destroyers. Admiral Burrough relocated his flag to the destroyer HMS Ashanti. Nigeria safely arrived at Gibraltar, where she stayed for over a year undergoing repairs returning to action in September 1943. Two torpedoes then struck the light cruiser HMS Cairo moving at 8 knots (15 km/h; 9.2 mph), blowing off the vessel's stern with one of the propellers and killing 24 crew members. After the crew was evacuated, Cairo was scuttled with gunfire by HMS Derwent.

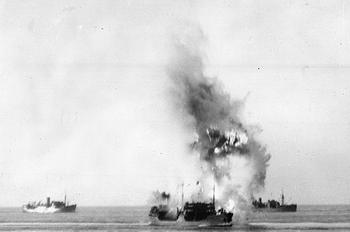
Torpedo from Axum striking SS Ohio

The fourth torpedo struck the tanker SS Ohio, causing heavy damage. It was probably the most important merchant ship of the convoy, being the only oil tanker carrying fuel for Malta. Within twenty minutes, the tanker's crew was able to extinguish the fires and continue at 13 knots despite damage. The ship was hit by several bombs on her journey, but the determination of her crew, and support of several destroyers that guarded her, allowed Ohio to reach Malta on 15 August 1942. After unloading fuel, Ohio finally sank, breaking in two in Malta's harbor.

After four and half minutes after torpedo launch, escorts went on offensive. Axum was at 65 m (213 ft) depth when the depth charge attacks started, and the submarine quickly dived to 100 m (330 ft). The hunt continued for roughly 2 hours and 60 depth charges were thrown. At 22:50 Axum surfaced to observe the damage and assess the situation. Noting enemy's destroyers in the distance, Axum submerged and went north. She surfaced again at 1:30 on 14 August. The damage sustained by the submarine prevented her from diving below 40 m (130 ft); nevertheless, Axum stayed in the area patrolling for the next two days, and returned to Trapani on 15 August 1942, at 19:30. In October and November 1942 she patrolled off the Balearic Islands. On 7 November 1942, she sighted enemy ships, but was detected and was forced to dive and withstand a barrage of depth charges which caused some damage. On 9 November Axum left the patrol area and headed back to the base due to sustained damage.

In February 1943 Axum patrolled in the Gulf of Sirte but did not encounter any traffic. On 11 April, while sailing in a violent storm off the coast of Sardinia, sustained flooding and lost the use of both of her periscopes forcing her to abandon her mission and return to the base. On 21 July Axum, while proceeding from La Spezia to La Maddalena, was spotted in the position 42°35′N 08°38′E, five miles (8.0 km) northwest of Calvi, by the British submarine Templar. Templar fired a total of seven torpedoes over the course of several attacks but they all missed the target.

At the announcement of the armistice, on 8 September 1943 Axum was at Gaeta to carry out repair work on her diesel engines. Early on 9 September, Germans tried to capture ships in the harbor, and at 2:15 Axum managed to get away with only one engine running. The submarine sailed to the island of Montecristo where Axum remained throughout the night. On 10 September, she reached Portoferraio, and from there proceeded to Palermo. After repairs at Palermo, she sailed to Malta. On 9 October 1943, she left Malta for Taranto where she underwent further repairs including to her second engine. For the rest of the war, Axum was used only to infiltration missions (bringing and taking spies and sabotage teams from German-occupied territories). During one of those missions, on 25 December 1943 Axum left Taranto to recover spies from the Gulf of Kyparissia. In the evening of 27 December, Axum arrived at the rendezvous point on the west coast of Morea. While waiting for a sailboat to bring back the spies, Axum was drifting towards the coast when she ran aground on unknown rock formation. All efforts to dislodge the submarine failed, so in the afternoon of 28 December 1943 the submarine was scuttled with explosive charges at Kaiafas beach, in the position 37°31′N 21°35′E. The submarine crew and the spies had to spend a month in the mountains around Morea. Finally, at the end of January 1944, the crew and the spies were picked off Marathopolis (now part of Gargalianoi), near Proti Island by the escort Ardimentoso.
