= Italian submarine Delfino (1890) =

First submarine of the Italian Regia Marina

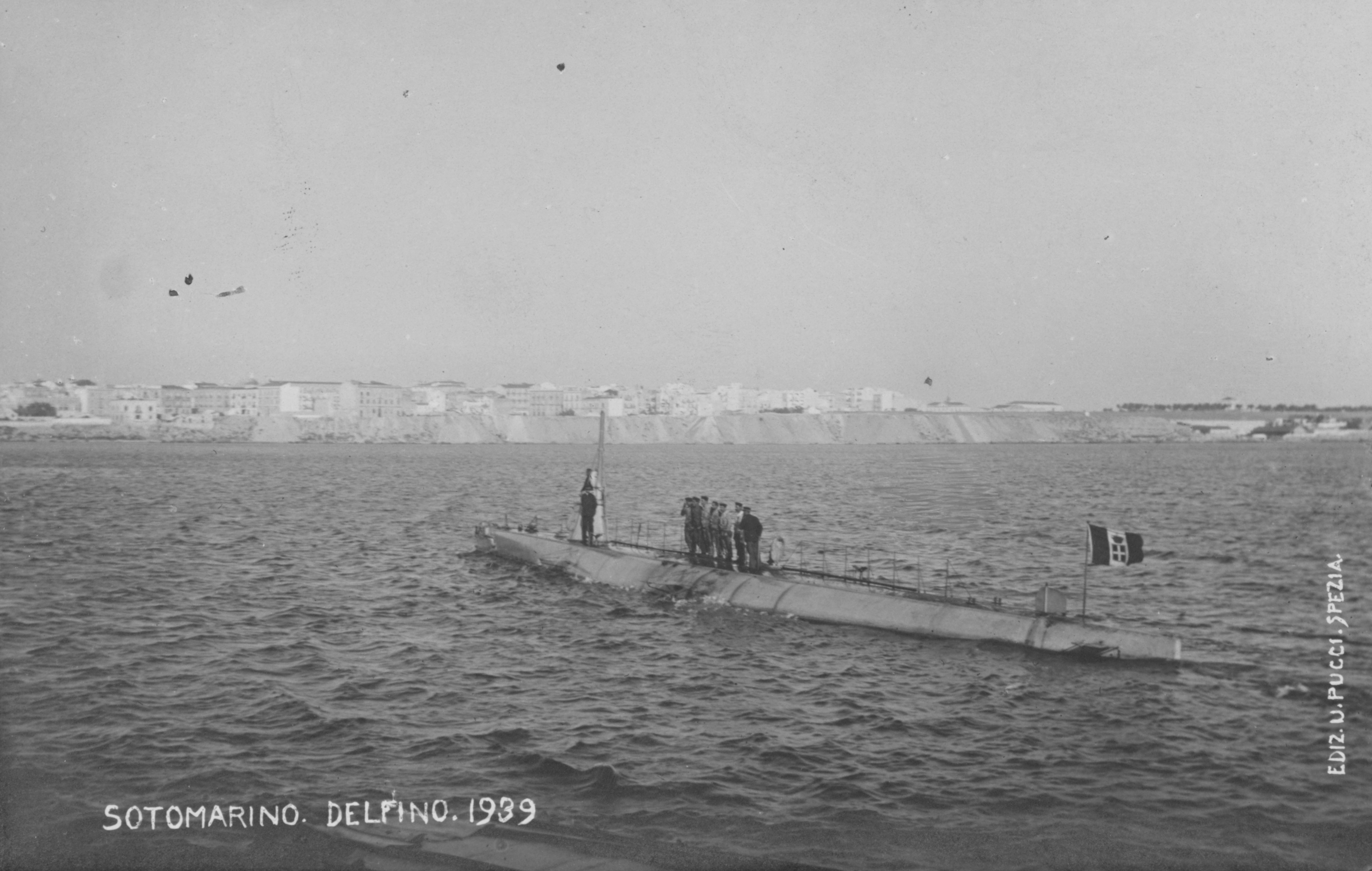
- Delfino cruising on the surface after her 1904 reconstruction

History

Italy
- Name: Delfino
- Namesake: Dolphin
- Builder: Arsenale di La Spezia
- Laid down: 1889
- Launched: 1890
- Commissioned: 1 April 1895
- Fate: In reserve, September 1918, Stricken January 1919

General characteristics (as built)
- Type: Submarine
- Displacement: 95 long tons (97 t) surfaced; 107 long tons (109 t) submerged
- Length: 24 m (78 ft 9 in)
- Beam: 2.89 m (9 ft 6 in)
- Draught: 2.56 m (8 ft 5 in)
- Propulsion: 1 × electric motor, 65 HP; 1 shafts
- Speed: 6 knots (11 km/h; 6.9 mph) surfaced; 5 knots (9.3 km/h; 5.8 mph) submerged
- Range: 24 nmi (44 km; 28 mi) at 2 knots (3.7 km/h; 2.3 mph)
- Test depth: 30 m (98 ft)
- Complement: 8
- Armament: 1 × 350 mm (14 in) torpedo tube

The Italian submarine Delfino (“Dolphin”) was built at the end of the 19th century and was the first submarine of the Regia Marina. She remained in service until the end of the First World War.

== Design and construction ==
Delfino was designed by marine engineer Giacinto Pullino at the La Spezia Navy Yard. Accounts vary as to the date of her construction; it seems that she was built as an experimental craft and was under trials for several years before being accepted by the Italian Navy.

Delfino was laid down in 1889, launched in 1890 and completed in 1892. She commenced trials in April 1892 which continued until April 1895, when she was commissioned into the Regia Marina. (Her official records say she was built between 1892 and 1895, and was commissioned in 1896)

Delfino was a single hull design, powered by a 65 hp Savigliano electric motor driving a single screw, giving a surface speed of 6 knots (11 km/h; 6.9 mph) and a submerged speed of 5 knots (9.3 km/h; 5.8 mph), with a range of 24 nautical miles (44 km; 28 mi) cruising at 2 knots (3.7 km/h; 2.3 mph). She was controlled by vertical rudders two aft and unusually one forward) and horizontal planes fore and aft. She also had two vertical axis propellers to power vertical movement underwater, but these proved to give little advantage. She was armed with one 350 mm (14 in) torpedo tube and had a complement of 8 crewmen.

Delfino was modernized from 1902 to 1904; she was equipped with a 130 hp FIAT petrol engine which increased her surface speed to 10 knots (19 km/h; 12 mph), and her surface range to 165 nautical miles (306 km; 190 mi) cruising at 6 knots (11 km/h; 6.9 mph). The torpedo tube was changed to 450 mm (18 in) and her conning tower was enlarged for surface navigation.

== Service career ==
Delfino was commissioned on 1 April 1895 (official records say 1896) and she served with the Regia Marina into the 20th century. She was still in service at the outbreak of World War I and saw action in the Adriatic, carrying out some 44 war patrols, though she also served as a training vessel. At the end of hostilities Delfino was moved into reserve, and was stricken in January 1919.
