= Adua-class submarine =

Royal Italian Navy class of coastal submarines

- RSMG Adua

Class overview
- Name: Adua class
- Builders: OTO, Muggiano; CRDA, Monfalcone; Tosi, Taranto
- Operators: Regia Marina, Brazilian Navy
- Preceded by: Perla class
- Succeeded by: Acciaio class
- In commission: 1937–1947
- Completed: 17
- Lost: 16

General characteristics
- Type: Submarine
- Displacement: 680 long tons (691 t) surfaced; 844 long tons (858 t) submerged
- Length: 60.18 m (197 ft 5 in)
- Beam: 6.45 m (21 ft 2 in)
- Draft: 4.7 m (15 ft 5 in)
- Installed power: 1,200 bhp (890 kW) (diesels); 800 hp (600 kW) (electric motors)
- Propulsion: Diesel-electric; 2 × diesel engines; 2 × electric motors
- Speed: 14 knots (26 km/h; 16 mph) surfaced; 7.5 knots (13.9 km/h; 8.6 mph) submerged
- Range: 3,180 nmi (5,890 km; 3,660 mi) at 10.5 knots (19.4 km/h; 12.1 mph) surfaced; 74 nmi (137 km; 85 mi) at 4 knots (7.4 km/h; 4.6 mph) submerged
- Test depth: 80 m (260 ft)
- Complement: 45
- Armament: 6 × 533 mm (21 in) torpedo tubes (4 bow, 2 stern); 1 × single 100 mm (4 in) / 47 caliber deck gun; 1 or 2 x single 13.2 mm (0.52 in) anti-aircraft guns

The Adua-class submarine was the fourth sub-class of the 600 Series of coastal submarines built for the Regia Marina (Royal Italian Navy) during the 1930s. There were 17 submarines in this class, almost all named after places in Ethiopia which had been occupied by Italy since 1936, but only one, Alagi, survived World War II. Three submarines of this class (Gondar, Ascianghi, and Neghelli) were sold to Brazil before the war and replaced with submarines of the same names.

== Design and description ==
The Adua-class submarines were essentially repeats of the preceding Perla class design. They displaced 680 long tons (690 t) surfaced and 844 long tons (858 t) submerged. The submarines were 60.18 meters (197 ft 5 in) long, had a beam of 6.45 meters (21 ft 2 in) and a draft of 4.7 meters (15 ft 5 in).

For surface running, the boats were powered by two 600-brake-horsepower (447 kW) diesel engines, each driving one propeller shaft. When submerged each propeller was driven by a 400-horsepower (298 kW) electric motor. They could reach 14 knots (26 km/h; 16 mph) on the surface and 7.5 knots (13.9 km/h; 8.6 mph) underwater. On the surface, the Adua class had a range of 3,180 nautical miles (5,890 km; 3,660 mi) at 10.5 knots (19.4 km/h; 12.1 mph), submerged, they had a range of 74 nmi (137 km; 85 mi) at 4 knots (7.4 km/h; 4.6 mph).

The boats were armed with six internal 53.3 cm (21.0 in) torpedo tubes, four in the bow and two in the stern. One reload torpedo was carried for each tube, for a total of twelve. They were also armed with one 100 mm (3.9 in) deck gun for combat on the surface. The light anti-aircraft armament consisted of one or two pairs of 13.2 mm (0.52 in) machine guns.

== Ships ==
List of Adua-class submarines
Ship	Builder	Launched	Fate
Adua	CRDA	13 March 1936	sunk on 30 September 1941, by destroyers HMS Gurkha and HMS Legion, Western Mediterranean sea
Alagi	CRDA	15 November 1936	sold for scrap on 1 February 1948
Aradam	CRDA	18 October 1936	sunk on 4 September 1944 in Genoa by Allied bombers
Ascianghi	OTO	5 December 1937	scuttled near Augusta, Sicily, on 23 July 1943, after attack by destroyers HMS Laforey and HMS Eclipse
Axum	CRDA	27 September 1936	scuttled near Morea on 28 December 1943, during a mission for the Allies
Beilul	OTO	22 May 1938	sunk by Allied air attack, May 1944
Dagabur	Tosi	22 November 1936	sunk during Operation Pedestal by the British destroyer HMS Wolverine
Dessiè	Tosi	22 November 1936	sunk on 28 November 1942 by destroyers HMS Quiberon and HMS Quentin, near Bona, Algeria.
Durbo	OTO	6 March 1938	scuttled on 18 October 1940 east of Gibraltar after attack by destroyers HMS Firedrake and HMS Wrestler
Gondar	OTO	3 October 1937	scuttled on 30 September 1940, near Alexandria, after a 14-hour-long attack by destroyers HMAS Stuart, HMS Diamond and Sunderland flying boats
Lafolè	OTO	10 April 1938	sunk on 20 October 1940, north of Melilla by destroyers HMS Gallant, HMS Hotspur and HMS Griffin
Macallé	OTO	29 October 1936	assigned to the Red Sea Flotilla and ran aground on 15 June 1940 when the crew was disabled by central nervous system poisoning from a chloromethane leak in the ship's air conditioning system.
Neghelli	OTO	7 November 1937	sunk on 19 January 1941 by destroyer HMS Greyhound
Scirè	OTO	6 January 1938	sunk on 10 August 1942 off Haifa by HMT Islay
Tembien	OTO	6 February 1938	sunk on 2 August 1941, west of Malta, by HMS Hermione
Uarsciek	Tosi	19 September 1937	sunk on 15 December 1942, south of Malta, by HMS Petard and the Greek destroyer Vasilissa Olga
Uebi Scebeli	Tosi	3 October 1937	sunk on 29 June 1940 by HMS Dainty and HMS Ilex

== Service ==
The boats, once commissioned, were assigned to complete the squadrons of "600" submarines strengthening the 11th and 14th Squadrons at La Spezia and 43rd at Taranto. After initial training, many of these boats carried out training cruises in the Dodecanese and along the coast of North Africa.

During the Spanish Civil War (1937–1938) five of the submarines already in service made seven special missions on behalf the Franco's regime without much success.

During 1938–39 the boats largely changed their assignment locations: there was at first a single squadron on four submarines at La Spezia four other submarines formed the 23rd Squadron at Naples, and five more were assigned to Leros. In 1939 there was not a single boat of the series at La Spezia, while the squadron at Leros was strengthened. In 1939 four boats from Naples and Taranto bases were sent to Tobruk.

At the outbreak of the World War II, there were four submarines assigned to each of the bases of La Spezia, Cagliari, Messina and Taranto, and one submarine, Macallé was located at the Red Sea base of Massawa.

== See also ==
- Italian submarines of World War II
