= Italian submarine Medusa (1931) =

Italian submarine

History

Kingdom of Italy
- Name: Medusa
- Namesake: Medusa
- Builder: Cantieri Riuniti dell'Adriatico, Monfalcone
- Laid down: 1929–1930
- Launched: 10 December 1931
- Completed: 1932
- Fate: Sunk, 30 January 1942

General characteristics
- Class & type: Argonauta-class submarine
- Displacement: 660 t (650 long tons) (surfaced); 813 t (800 long tons) (submerged)
- Length: 61.5 m (202 ft)
- Beam: 5.7 m (18 ft 8 in)
- Draft: 4.7 m (15 ft 5 in)
- Installed power: 1,500 bhp (1,100 kW) (diesels); 800 hp (600 kW) (electric motors)
- Propulsion: 2 shafts; diesel-electric; 2 × diesel engines; 2 × electric motors
- Speed: 14 knots (26 km/h; 16 mph) (surfaced); 8 knots (15 km/h; 9.2 mph) (submerged)
- Range: 5,000 nmi (9,300 km; 5,800 mi) at 8 knots (15 km/h; 9.2 mph) (surfaced); 110 nmi (200 km; 130 mi) at 3 knots (5.6 km/h; 3.5 mph) (submerged)
- Test depth: 80 m (260 ft)
- Armament: 1 × single 102 mm (4 in) deck gun; 2 × single 13.2 mm (0.52 in) machine guns; 6 × 533 mm (21 in) torpedo tubes (4 bow, 2 stern)

Medusa was one of seven Argonauta-class submarines built for the Regia Marina (Royal Italian Navy) during the early 1930s.

== Design and description ==
The Argonauta class was derived from the earlier Squalo-class submarines. They displaced 660 metric tons (650 long tons) surfaced and 813 metric tons (800 long tons) submerged. The submarines were 61.5 meters (201 ft 9 in) long, had a beam of 5.7 meters (18 ft 8 in) and a draft of 4.7 meters (15 ft 5 in). They had an operational diving depth of 80 meters (260 ft). Their crew numbered 44 officers and enlisted men.

For surface running, the boats were powered by two 750-brake-horsepower (559 kW) diesel engines, each driving one propeller shaft. When submerged each propeller was driven by a 400-horsepower (298 kW) electric motor. They could reach 14 knots (26 km/h; 16 mph) on the surface and 8 knots (15 km/h; 9.2 mph) underwater. On the surface, the Settembrini class had a range of 5,000 nautical miles (9,300 km; 5,800 mi) at 8 knots (15 km/h; 9.2 mph); submerged, they had a range of 110 nmi (200 km; 130 mi) at 3 knots (5.6 km/h; 3.5 mph).

The boats were armed with six 53.3-centimeter (21 in) torpedo tubes, four in the bow and two in the stern for which they carried a total of 12 torpedoes. They were also armed with a single 102-millimeter (4 in) deck gun forward of the conning tower for combat on the surface. Their anti-aircraft armament consisted of two single 13.2-millimeter (0.52 in) machine guns.

== Construction and career ==
Medusa was laid down by Cantieri Riuniti dell'Adriatico at their Monfalcone shipyard in 1929–1930, launched on 10 December 1931 and completed the following year. Medusa was torpedoed and sunk on 30 January 1942 in the Adriatic near Promontore, Istria by the submarine HMS Thorn.
