= Italian submarine Serpente =

Italian submarine

History

Kingdom of Italy
- Name: Serpente
- Builder: Cantieri navali Tosi di Taranto, Taranto
- Laid down: 1930
- Launched: 28 February 1932
- Completed: 1933
- Renamed: From Nautilus
- Fate: Scuttled, 12 September 1943

General characteristics
- Class & type: Argonauta-class submarine
- Displacement: 660 t (650 long tons) (surfaced); 813 t (800 long tons) (submerged)
- Length: 61.5 m (202 ft)
- Beam: 5.7 m (18 ft 8 in)
- Draft: 4.7 m (15 ft 5 in)
- Installed power: 1,500 bhp (1,100 kW) (diesels); 800 hp (600 kW) (electric motors)
- Propulsion: 2 shafts; diesel-electric; 2 × diesel engines; 2 × electric motors
- Speed: 14 knots (26 km/h; 16 mph) (surfaced); 8 knots (15 km/h; 9.2 mph) (submerged)
- Range: 5,000 nmi (9,300 km; 5,800 mi) at 8 knots (15 km/h; 9.2 mph) (surfaced); 110 nmi (200 km; 130 mi) at 3 knots (5.6 km/h; 3.5 mph) (submerged)
- Test depth: 80 m (260 ft)
- Armament: 1 × single 102 mm (4 in) deck gun; 2 × single 13.2 mm (0.52 in) machine guns; 6 × 533 mm (21 in) torpedo tubes (4 bow, 2 stern)

Serpente was one of seven Argonauta-class submarines built for the Regia Marina (Royal Italian Navy) during the early 1930s.

== Design and description ==
The Argonauta class was derived from the earlier Squalo-class submarines. They displaced 660 metric tons (650 long tons) surfaced and 813 metric tons (800 long tons) submerged. The submarines were 61.5 meters (201 ft 9 in) long, had a beam of 5.7 meters (18 ft 8 in) and a draft of 4.7 meters (15 ft 5 in). They had an operational diving depth of 80 meters (260 ft). Their crew numbered 44 officers and enlisted men.

For surface running, the boats were powered by two 750-brake-horsepower (559 kW) diesel engines, each driving one propeller shaft. When submerged each propeller was driven by a 400-horsepower (298 kW) electric motor. They could reach 14 knots (26 km/h; 16 mph) on the surface and 8 knots (15 km/h; 9.2 mph) underwater. On the surface, the Settembrini class had a range of 5,000 nautical miles (9,300 km; 5,800 mi) at 8 knots (15 km/h; 9.2 mph); submerged, they had a range of 110 nmi (200 km; 130 mi) at 3 knots (5.6 km/h; 3.5 mph).

The boats were armed with six 53.3-centimeter (21 in) torpedo tubes, four in the bow and two in the stern for which they carried a total of 12 torpedoes. They were also armed with a single 102-millimeter (4 in) deck gun forward of the conning tower for combat on the surface. Their anti-aircraft armament consisted of two single 13.2-millimeter (0.52 in) machine guns.

== Construction and career ==
Serpente was laid down by Cantieri navali Tosi di Taranto at their Taranto shipyard in 1930, launched on 28 February 1932 and completed the following year.
