= Italian submarine Beilul =

Italian submarine

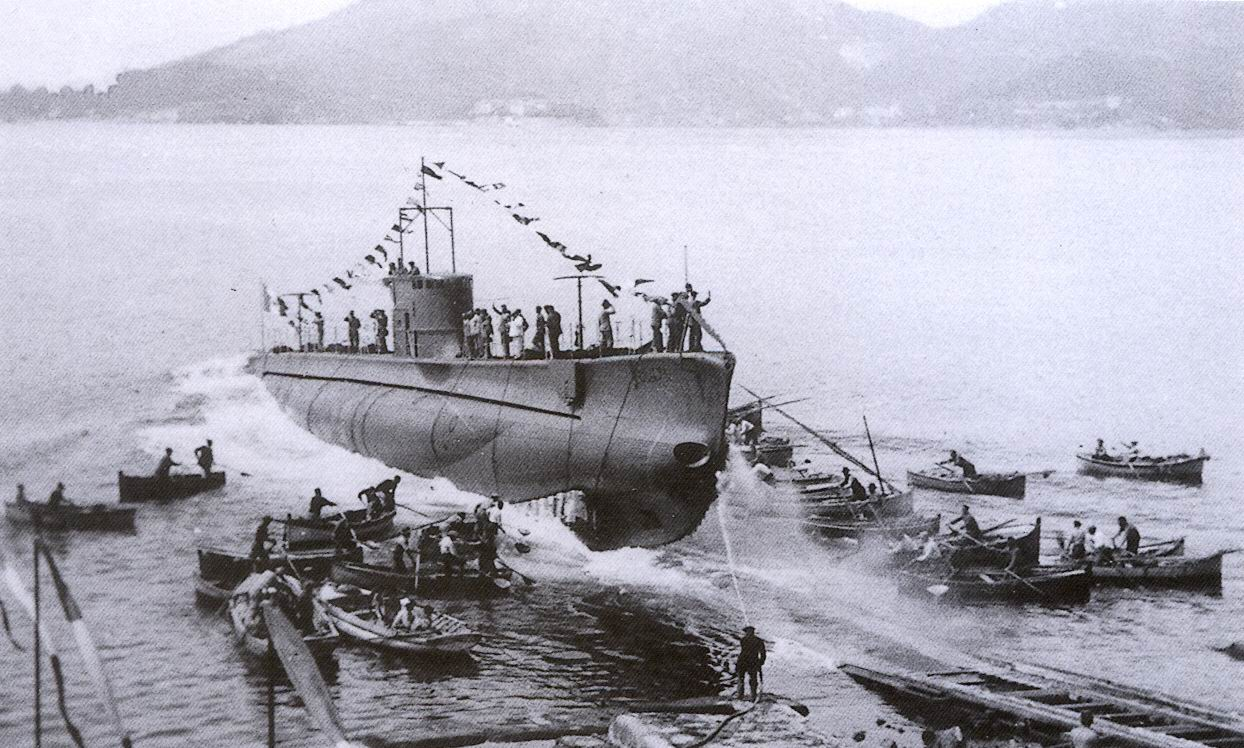
- Launch of RIN Beilul

History

Kingdom of Italy
- Name: Beilul
- Namesake: Beilul
- Builder: OTO
- Laid down: 2 July 1937
- Launched: 22 May 1938
- Commissioned: 14 September 1938
- Fate: Sunk, May 1944

General characteristics
- Class & type: 600-Serie Adua-class submarine
- Displacement: 680 long tons (691 t) surfaced; 844 long tons (858 t) submerged
- Length: 60.18 m (197 ft 5 in)
- Beam: 6.45 m (21 ft 2 in)
- Draft: 4.7 m (15 ft 5 in)
- Installed power: 1,200 bhp (890 kW) (diesels); 800 hp (600 kW) (electric motors)
- Propulsion: Diesel-electric; 2 × FIAT diesel engines; 2 × Marelli electric motors
- Speed: 14 knots (26 km/h; 16 mph) surfaced; 7.5 knots (13.9 km/h; 8.6 mph) submerged
- Range: 3,180 nmi (5,890 km; 3,660 mi) at 10.5 knots (19.4 km/h; 12.1 mph) surfaced; 74 nmi (137 km; 85 mi) at 4 knots (7.4 km/h; 4.6 mph) submerged
- Test depth: 80 m (260 ft)
- Complement: 44 (4 officers + 40 non-officers and sailors)
- Armament: 6 × 533 mm (21 in) torpedo tubes (4 bow, 2 stern); 1 × 100 mm (4 in) / 47 caliber deck gun; 2 x 1 – 13.2 mm (0.52 in) anti-aircraft guns

Italian submarine Beilul was an Adua-class submarine built for the Royal Italian Navy (Regia Marina) during the 1930s. It was named after a town of Beilul in Eritrea.

== Design and description ==
The Adua-class submarines were essentially repeats of the preceding Perla class. They displaced 680 long tons (690 t) surfaced and 844 long tons (858 t) submerged. The submarines were 60.18 meters (197 ft 5 in) long, had a beam of 6.45 meters (21 ft 2 in) and a draft of 4.7 meters (15 ft 5 in).

For surface running, the boats were powered by two 600-brake-horsepower (447 kW) diesel engines, each driving one propeller shaft. When submerged each propeller was driven by a 400-horsepower (298 kW) electric motor. They could reach 14 knots (26 km/h; 16 mph) on the surface and 7.5 knots (13.9 km/h; 8.6 mph) underwater. On the surface, the Adua class had a range of 3,180 nautical miles (5,890 km; 3,660 mi) at 10.5 knots (19.4 km/h; 12.1 mph), submerged, they had a range of 74 nmi (137 km; 85 mi) at 4 knots (7.4 km/h; 4.6 mph).

The boats were armed with six internal 53.3 cm (21.0 in) torpedo tubes, four in the bow and two in the stern. They were also armed with one 100 mm (4 in) deck gun for combat on the surface. The light anti-aircraft armament consisted of one or two pairs of 13.2 mm (0.52 in) machine guns.

== Construction and career ==
Beilul was launched on 22 May 1938 in OTO's shipyard in La Spezia and commissioned on 14 September 1938. After an endurance training in the Dodecanese, in December of 1938 Beilul was assigned to Leros. In May of 1940 she was reassigned to 35th Squadron (III Submarine Group) based at Augusta. Her commander at the time was Paolo Vagliasindi.

At the outbreak of hostilities she was immediately sent on a mission to patrol an area between Pantelleria and Lampedusa. She returned to the base on June 19, 1940, without encountering any enemy traffic.

On June 29, 1940 Beilul made a reconnaissance mission near Alexandria surveying British Mediterranean Fleet. In early July Beilul along with Tricheco, Smeraldo and Lafolè was sent to patrol an area between Derna and Gavdos. In the evening of July 7, 1940 while patrolling in the waters off Crete, in approximate position 32°40′N 28°10′E, Beilul sighted and attacked on the surface from about 1000 yards an enemy destroyer, part of the British Mediterranean Fleet. The submarine then had to withstand a series of depth charge attacks which caused significant damage, forcing her to abort the mission and return to base.

On September 17, 1940 Beilul together with Narvalo, Delfino and Squalo started their patrols north of Crete.

On January 1, 1941 Beilul started her new mission in the Aegean remaining on patrol until January 12. On January 8, 1941, lurking in the waters north of Kasos, she sighted a formation composed of five merchant ships and three escorts. While on the surface, Beilul fired four torpedoes at two ships and immediately disengaged by rapid diving. The outcome of this attack is unknown, since British documentation does not contain any information about sinking or sustained damage at the date and place of the attack.

From February 9 through February 18, 1941 Beilul and Sirena patrolled in the Aegean.

From May 12 through May 20, 1941 she patrolled to the northwest of Alexandria together with Salpa.

During the mission from 25 November to 5 December 1941 Beilul was assigned to patrol an area 25 miles north of Derna. On the evening of December 1, Beilul, now under command of captain Francesco Pedrotti, was attacked on the surface by a Sunderland flying boat. The crew of the submarine managed to beat back the attack with her anti-aircraft weapons and forced the aircraft to turn away, visibly damaged and on fire. The plane's attack, however, caused some damage to the boat, forcing her to return to the base.

On June 4, 1942, while on patrol off the coast of Cyrenaica, she sighted two small convoys. Beilui launched three torpedoes, but failed to hit the targets. She was detected by the escorts and was subjected to intense and prolonged depth charge attacks. The damage sustained by the submarine forced her to return to the base. On June 6, she docked at Leros. It took several months to repair the damage.

On June 12, 1943, now under command of captain Pasquale Beltrame, Beilul, patrolling off Capo Passero, sighted a formation of three British J-class destroyers. From about 1500 m she launched three torpedoes and disengaged by diving. No hits were reported.

Beilul then was sent to Monfalcone for a long period of repairs and upgrades. On September 3, 1943, Italy signed Armistice of Cassibile surrendering to Allies. On September 9, 1943, Beilul while still under repair and immobilized, was captured by the Germans, who turned it into fuel storage barge. It was sunk in Monfalcone some time in May 1944 as a result of an Allied air attack.
