= HMS Wrestler =

Destroyer of the Royal Navy

- HMS Wrestler underway

History

United Kingdom
- Name: Wrestler
- Ordered: 9 December 1916
- Builder: Swan Hunter, Wallsend
- Laid down: July 1917
- Launched: 25 February 1918
- Commissioned: 15 May 1918
- Out of service: 6 June 1944
- Motto: "Nitendo vincimus"; ("By doing our utmost we win")
- Fate: Mined off Juno Beach, 6 June 1944; Sold for scrap, 20 July 1944

General characteristics
- Class & type: W
- Displacement: 1,100 long tons (1,118 t)
- Length: 300 ft (91 m) o/a; 312 ft (95 m) p/p
- Beam: 26 ft 6 in (8.08 m)
- Draught: 11 ft 11 1/2 in (3.64 m) deep
- Installed power: 3 × Yarrow boilers; 27,000 shp (20,000 kW)
- Propulsion: Parsons steam turbines; 2 shafts
- Speed: 34 knots (63 km/h; 39 mph)
- Range: 3,500 nmi (6,500 km) at 15 kn (28 km/h; 17 mph)
- Complement: 110
- Armament: 4 × QF 4 in (102 mm) gun; 1 × QF 12 pdr (76 mm); 2 × triple 21 inch (533 mm) torpedo tubes

HMS Wrestler (D35) was a W-class destroyer built by the Royal Navy during the First World War and active from 1939 to 1944 during the Second World War. She was the first Royal Navy ship to bear that name, and the only one to do so to date.

== Construction and design ==
On 9 December 1916, the British Admiralty placed an order for 21 large destroyers based on the V class as part of the 10th War Construction Programme, which became the Admiralty W class. This order included two destroyers, Whirlwind and Wrestler, to be built by Swan Hunter.

Wrestler was 312 feet (95.1 m) long overall and 300 feet (91.4 m) between perpendiculars, with a beam of 26 feet 6 inches (8.08 m) and a draught of between 10 feet 9 inches (3.28 m) and 11 feet 11 1/2 inches (3.64 m) depending on load. Displacement was 1,100 long tons (1,100 t) standard, and up to 1,490 long tons (1,510 t) deep load. Three oil-fed Yarrow boilers raising steam at 250 pounds per square inch (1,700 kPa) fed Brown-Curtis geared steam turbines which developed 27,000 shaft horsepower (20,000 kW), driving two screws for a maximum designed speed of 34 knots (63 km/h; 39 mph). The ship carried 368 long tons (374 t) of oil giving a range of 3,500 nautical miles (6,500 km; 4,000 mi) at 15 knots (28 km/h; 17 mph).

The ship had a main gun armament of four 4-inch Mk V QF guns in single mounts on the ship's centreline. These were disposed as two forward and two aft in superimposed firing positions. A single QF 3-inch (76 mm) 20 cwt (Note: "Cwt" is the abbreviation for hundredweight, 20 cwt referring to the weight of the gun.) anti-aircraft gun was mounted aft of the second funnel. Aft of the 3-inch gun, six 21-inch torpedo tubes were carried, mounted in two triple mounts on the centreline. As built, the W-class had a complement of 134 officers and other ranks.

Wrestler, the first ship of that name to serve with the Royal Navy, was laid down at Swan Hunter's Wallsend shipyard during July 1917, and was launched on 25 February 1918. She was commissioned on 1 May 1918, and was completed on 15 May that year.

=== Modifications ===
By 1931, Wrestler was recorded as having her 3-inch anti aircraft gun replaced by two 2-pounder (40 mm) pom-pom autocannon, although one of these had been removed by 1939. While most of the class had one bank of torpedo tubes removed in 1940 to accommodate a 3-inch anti-aircraft gun, Wrestler was, at least initially, not modified. Close-range anti-aircraft armament was improved by adding a second pom-pom and two Oerlikon 20 mm cannon.

Conversion to long-range escort involved removal of a boiler, which was replaced by fuel tanks and an additional mess deck (the elderly V & Ws were overcrowded so additional accommodation was welcome). Power dropped to 18,000 shp (13,000 kW) and speed to 24.5 kn (28.2 mph; 45.4 km/h). The forward "A"-mount 4-inch gun was replaced by a Hedgehog anti-submarine mortar, while the aft-most ("Y"-mount) 4-inch guns and the torpedo tubes were removed to allow a heavier depth-charge armament to be carried. Wrestler was also converted for arctic use, with additional ballast to counter the buildup of topweight owing to icing, and improved insulation and heating.

== Service history ==
Wrestler joined the 12th Destroyer Flotilla of the Grand Fleet on commissioning. During May 1918, the battleship Hindustan was in collision with Wrestler, badly damaging the destroyer. Wrestler remained part of the 12th Flotilla on 11 November 1918, when the Armistice with Germany ended the fighting of the First World War.

In March 1919, in a reorganisation of the Royal Navy, Wrestler transferred to the 3rd Destroyer Flotilla of what became the Atlantic Fleet, based at Rosyth. In 1919, Wrestler took part in the British campaign in the Baltic, part of the Allied intervention in the Russian Civil War. On 15 July 1919, the minesweepers Gentian and Myrtle struck mines while clearing a minefield east of Saaremaa. While Myrtle sank quickly, Gentian remained afloat, and on 16 July, Wrestler arrived at the scene with the Estonian tug Ebba, but the weather was too bad for towing the sloop to safety, and Gentian sank on 17 July.

In March 1920, Wrestler transferred to the 1st Destroyer Flotilla. The ship was paid off at Chatham on 1 December 1920 and recommissioned with a new crew on the same day for further service with the 1st Flotilla. In 1921, the Royal Navy's destroyer forces were again reorganised into smaller flotillas of eight destroyers and one destroyer leader, compared with the larger flotillas (of 16 destroyers) previously used, with Wrestler moving to the 5th Destroyer Flotilla. On 8 October 1921, the American steamer West Camak rammed the British passenger ship Rowan from astern in fog in the North Channel. Rowan's passengers were mustered on deck. The British steamer Clan Malcolm then rammed Rowan from starboard and cut her in two. Rowan sank with the loss of 22 of the 97 people on board. Wrestler joined Clan Malcolm and West Camak in rescuing survivors from Rowan. (Note: Wrestler rescued 17 survivors and two dead bodies according to English, and 26 people according to The Times.)

Wrestler was reduced to reserve at the Nore in January 1922, but in May that year was recommissioned to serve as tender to HMS Vernon the torpedo school at Portsmouth. On 27 June 1927, Wrestler formed part of the escort for the battlecruiser Renown, carrying the Duke and Duchess of York into Portsmouth at the end of their tour of Australia and New Zealand. On 24 January 1928, Wrestler, together with the destroyer Vanoc, escorted the minesweeper Caterham as she carried the body of Admiral of the Fleet John de Robeck from Portsmouth to the Isle of Wight. Wrestler was refitted at Chatham from 30 April to 2 December 1930, with her boiler tubes being replaced. On 15–17 July 1935, Wrestler took part in King George V's Silver Jubilee Fleet Review, escorting the Royal yacht Victoria and Albert. In September 1935, Wrestler joined the 21st Destroyer Flotilla, which had been formed from ships in reserve and second line duties as temporary replacement for Home Fleet destroyer flotillas sent to the Mediterranean Sea because of the Abyssinia Crisis. On 13 October 1935, Wrestler went to the aid of the Norwegian tanker Barfonn, which had been damaged by an explosion in one of her oil tanks, which killed three, when off Portland Bill. Wrestler was returned to reserve in February 1936 before being refitted at Portsmouth and rejoining Vernon in November that year. She continued to serve at Vernon until March 1939.

Wrestler was one of 36 V and W-class destroyers that were listed as being earmarked for conversion to WAIR-type anti-aircraft escort destroyers in 1938, and in May 1939, was sent to Malta for survey prior to conversion. On 15 August 1938, the unconverted Wrestler was reduced to reserve at Gibraltar.

=== Second World War ===
Wrestler was recommissioned at Gibraltar on 28 August 1939, joining the 13th Destroyer Flotilla, with duties including convoy escort in the Atlantic in the early stages of the Battle of the Atlantic. In December 1939, Wrestler entered a refit at Malta, which continued until March, having her boiler tubes replaced. In April 1940, Wrestler returned to Britain, where she was fitted with a Degaussing coil and at the start of May 1940, returned to Gibraltar as escort to the battleship Warspite.

On 3 July 1940 Wrestler she was present at the British attack on the Vichy French fleet at Mers-el-Kébir, Algeria, where she was assigned to watch the nearby port of Oran. The British bombardment sank the battleship Bretagne and damaged the battleships Provence and Dunkerque, but the French battleship Strasbourg managed to avoid damage and escaped the harbour, firing on Wrestler as the battleship left Mers-el-Kébir, forcing Wrestler to withdraw behind a smokescreen. Wrestler later picked up the crews of two British aircraft that were shot down while unsuccessfully attacking Strasbourg.

On 8 July, Wrestler (Note: Rohwer and Hümmelchen do not list Wrestler as taking part in the operation, however.) sailed with Force H on a diversion for operations of the Mediterranean Fleet to cover the passage from Malta to Alexandria of two convoys. As part of this diversion, aircraft from the carrier Ark Royal would attack Cagliari in Sicily. The attack on Cagliari was abandoned after Force H came under heavy air attack on 9 July, while the Mediterranean Fleet operations resulted in the Battle of Calabria. On 31 July, Wrestler left Gibraltar as part of Force H for Operation Hurry, in which Ark Royal, escorted by most of Force H, including Wrestler would launch an air attack against Cagliari, while the carrier Argus would fly off 12 Hawker Hurricane fighters to Malta. This time Ark Royal's Swordfish bombers successfully attacked Cagliari, while Argus's Hurricanes reached Malta safely and Force H returned to Gibraltar unharmed. On 18 October 1940, Wrestler, together with the destroyer Firedrake and two Saro London flying boats of 202 Squadron RAF attacked and sank the Italian Adua-class submarine Durbo east of Gibraltar. Before Durbo sank, a boarding party from the two destroyers seized code books and documents that led to the Italian submarine Lafolè being sunk by the destroyers Gallant, Griffin and Hotspur on 20 October.

From 5–8 May 1941, Wrestler took part in Operation Tiger, in which a convoy carrying much needed tanks and aircraft for the Eighth Army in the Western Desert was run through the Mediterranean from Gibraltar to Alexandria, with Force H escorting the convoy to near Malta. Wrestler remained based at Gibraltar until June 1941, when she transferred to Freetown, joining the 18th Destroyer Flotilla for convoy operations off West Africa. In November 1941, Wrestler returned to Gibraltar for refit and repair to her condensers, with the works continuing until March 1942. Wrestler was adopted by Hyde in December 1941 after a successful "Warship Week" National Savings campaign.

Wrestler returned to Force H based at Gibraltar, with duties including escorting so called Club Runs, aircraft delivery operations to Malta, and Malta Convoys. On 2 May 1942, a flying boat of 202 Squadron RAF (Note: The flying boat was a Short Sunderland according to Blair but a Consolidated Catalina according to Kemp and Rohwer and Hümmelchen. 202 Squadron operated both types of flying boat at the time.) attacked a surfaced German submarine near Cartagena. The flying boat remained above the site of the attack and summoned Wrestler and the destroyer Wishart, which made contact with the German submarine U-74 and sank the submarine in a series of depth-charge attacks. From 7 to 10 May 1942, Wrestler took part on Operation Bowery, forming part of the escort for the carriers Eagle and Wasp as they flew off 64 Spitfire fighters to Malta (61 arrived). From 17 to 20 May, Wrestler took part in another Club Run, when Eagle and Argus flew off 17 Spitfires, on 2–4 June 1942, when Eagle despatched 31 Spitfires, and on 7–9 June, when Eagle flew off 32 Spitfires. From 12 June 1942, Wrestler took part in Operation Harpoon, an attempt to run a convoy from Gibraltar to Malta, at the same time as another convoy (Operation Vigorous) would be run from Egypt to Malta, in order to divide opposing forces. Wrestler formed part of the covering force (Force W) that escorted the convoy as far as the Sicilian Narrows on 15 June. On 10–15 August 1942, Wrestler helped to escort the carrier Furious as she carried out a Club Run, despatching 37 Spitfires to Malta at the same time as the Operation Pedestal convoy to Malta took place.

In November 1942, the British and Americans launched Operation Torch, the invasion of French North Africa. On 21 October 1942, Wrestler left Britain as part of the escort to Convoy KX4A to Gibraltar, carrying troops and equipment for the invasion, and then formed part of the Eastern Naval Task Force bound for Algiers, left Gibraltar escorting Convoy KMS1 on 5 November with the landings taking place on 8 November. She then took part in the landings at Bougie (now Béjaïa), Algeria, on 11 November. On 15 November 1942 Wrestler was escorting the convoy MKF1, returning from the Mediterranean to the United Kingdom, and was about 80 nmi (92 mi; 150 km) west of Gibraltar, when her radar detected a surfaced submarine and ran ahead of the convoy to engage the submarine. The submarine dived as Wrestler approached, and Wrestler dropped a pattern of depth charges that sank U-98. The encounter caused the convoy to change course, however, which took in into the path of U-155, which sank the escort carrier Avenger and the troop transport Ettrick.

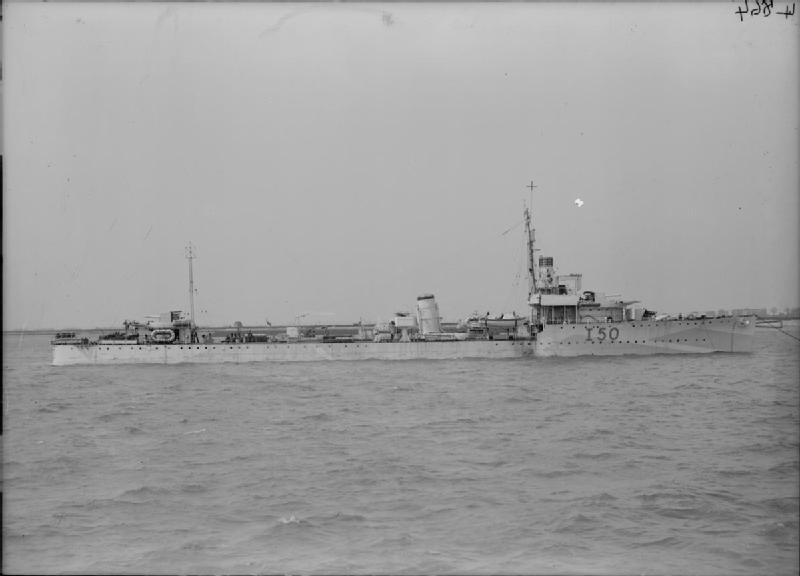
Wrestler after conversion to a Long Range Escort

From December 1942 to May 1943, Wrestler was refitted and modified to a Long Range Escort at Sheerness Dockyard, joining Western Approaches Command after completion of her reconstruction. In July 1943, Wrestler took part in Operation Husky, the Allied invasion of Sicily, escorting a convoy from Britain to the invasion area. She then returned to Atlantic and Russian convoy duties, forming part of the 3rd Escort Group in September 1943. From late September to early August 1943, Wrestler, now part of the 8th Support Group, escorted convoys to the Azores to help set up airbases for use by the RAF under the Anglo-Portuguese Alliance.

On 20 December 1943, the Arctic convoy JW 55B left Loch Ewe in Scotland, with Wrestler part of the convoy's close ocean escort, which consisted of 10 destroyers, two corvettes and a minesweeper, with a covering force of three cruisers and distant cover provided by the battleship Duke of York, another cruiser and four destroyers. The escort was reinforced with four destroyers detached from Convoy RA 55A on 25 December. When the convoy was threatened by German surface forces led by the German battleship Scharnhorst, Wrestler remained with the convoy, while the four destroyers from RA 55 were detached to join the cruiser force. On 26 December, the covering forces clashed with Scharnhorst in the Battle of the North Cape, which ended with the German battleship being sunk. The convoy reached the Kola Inlet on 30 December, unharmed. Wrestler sailed with the return convoy RA 55B, which left the Kola Inlet on 31 December 1943 and arrived, unharmed, back at Loch Ewe, on 8 January 1944. On 22 January 1944, Wrestler sailed as part of the local escort for Convoy JW 56B, which was relieved by the ocean escort on 26 January. On 27 March 1944, Wrestler joined the ocean escort of Convoy JW 58, continuing with the convoy until it arrived in Russia on 4 April. While the convoy came under heavy U-boat attack, the attacking submarines were driven off, with the convoy unscathed and three U-boats sunk. Wrestler escorted the return convoy, RA 58, which arrived in Scotland unharmed on 14 April. There was a large number of Allied merchant ships remaining at Russian arctic ports after the convoys of early 1944, and while the upcoming invasion of France meant that convoys to Russia would be suspended for several month, it was decided to run a convoy to escort these ships back to Britain, and Wrestler was part of an escort force that arrived at the Kola Inlet on 23 April 1944. As well as the 43 merchant ships that made up Convoy RA 59 when it left Kola on 28 April, the US Navy crew of the cruiser Milwaukee, which had been transferred to the Soviet Navy under Lend-Lease, and Soviet crews for British ships that were to be transferred to the Soviets also needed to be transported by Britain, and they were spread between the ships of the convoy and its escort, with Wrestler carrying 14 US Navy personnel. The convoy experienced extremely poor weather, and came under U-boat attack, which resulted in one merchant ship, the William S. Thayer, being sunk, while the convoy's escorts sank three U-boats.

June 1944 bought Operation Neptune (the naval side of D-Day). Wrestler left the Solent on 5 June 1944, escorting (together with two Motor Launches) Assault Convoy J7 (consisting of 15 LCT(4) landing craft carrying self-propelled artillery, 4 rocket-equipped LCT(R) to provide fire support for the landings and two LCS support landing craft, to Juno Beach. Wrestler spent much of the night of 5/6 June shepherding stray craft back into the swept channels, but at 06:37 hr on the morning of 6 June 1944, struck a mine while about a Cable length (approx 185 m) east of the swept channel. The explosion killed two men and wounded several more, with a fire breaking out and flooding occurring. The fire was extinguished and the flooding controlled, with the ship being taken under tow at 08:45 hr, arriving at Portsmouth at 23:50 hr. On examination, the damage was found to be severe and not worth repairing, and Wrestler was declared a constructive total loss. She was allocated to the ship breaker John Cashmore Ltd on 20 July 1944 and was scrapped at their Newport, Wales yard from 9 August 1944.

== Battle honours ==
References:

- Mediterranean 1940–42
- Atlantic 1940–43
- Malta Convoys 1942
- North Africa 1943
- Sicily 1943
- Arctic 1943–44
- Normandy 1944
- English Channel 1944

== See also ==
- Vice-Admiral Sir Gerard "Ged" Mansfield who served on the ship during the Second World War.

== Bibliography ==
- Barnett, Correlli (2000). Engage The Enemy More Closely. London: Penguin. ISBN 0-141-39008-5.
- Blair, Clay (2000). Hitler's U-Boat War: The Hunters 1939–1942. London: Cassell & Co. ISBN 0-304-35260-8.
- Blair, Clay (2000). Hitler's U-Boat War: The Hunted 1942–1945. New York: Modern Library. ISBN 0-679-64033-9.
- B.R. 1736 (31): Battle Summary No. 38: Operation "Torch": Invasion of North Africa November 1942 to February 1943 (PDF). Historical Section, Admiralty Naval Staff. 1948 – via Royal Australian Navy.
- B.R. 1736 (42): Battle Summary No. 39: Operation "Neptune" Landings in Normandy: June, 1944: Volume I. Tactical and Staff Duties Division, Admiralty. 1947. Part I: Preparation, Part II: Execution, Index.
- B.R. 1736 (42): Battle Summary No. 39: Operation "Neptune" Landings in Normandy: June, 1944: Volume II: Appendices. Tactical and Staff Duties Division, Admiralty. 1947. part 1 of 2: Appendix A to G, part 2 of 2: Appendix H to Q.
- Brown, D. K. (2007). Atlantic Escorts: Ships, Weapons & Tactics in World War II. Barnsley, UK: Seaforth Publishing. ISBN 978-1-84415-702-0.
- Burt, R. A. (1988). British Battleships 1889–1904. London: Arms and Armour Press. ISBN 0-85368-914-8.
- Campbell, John (1985). Naval Weapons of World War II. Annapolis, Maryland: Naval Institute Press. ISBN 0-87021-459-4.
- Colledge, J. J.; Warlow, Ben (2006) [1969]. Ships of the Royal Navy: The Complete Record of All Fighting Ships of the Royal Navy from the 15th Century to the Present (3rd Rev ed.). London: Chatham Publishing. ISBN 978-1-86176-281-8. OCLC 67375475.
- Dunn, Steve R. (2020). Battle in the Baltic: The Royal Navy and the Fight to Save Estonia & Latvia 1918–20. Barnsley, UK: Seaforth Publishing. ISBN 978-1-5267-4273-5.
- English, John (2019). Grand Fleet Destroyers: Part I: Flotilla Leaders and 'V/W' Class Destroyers. Windsor, UK: World Ship Society. ISBN 978-0-9650769-8-4.
- Friedman, Norman (2009). British Destroyers From Earliest Days to the Second World War. Barnsley, UK: Seaforth Publishing. ISBN 978-1-84832-049-9.
- Gardiner, Robert; Gray, Randal, eds. (1985). Conway's All the World's Fighting Ships 1906–1921. London: Conway Maritime Press. ISBN 0-85177-245-5.
- Greene, Jack; Massignani, Alessandro (2011). The Navy in the Mediterranean 1940–1943. London: Frontline Books. ISBN 978-1-84832-618-7.
- Halley, James J. (1973). Famous Maritime Squadrons of the RAF: Volume 1. Windsor, UK: Hylton Lacy. ISBN 0-85064-101-2.
- Hepper, David (2006). British Warship Losses in the Ironclad Era 1860–1919. London: Chatham Publishing. ISBN 9781861762733.
- Hepper, David (2022). British Warship Losses in the Modern Era 1920–1982. Barnsley, UK: Seaforth Publishing. ISBN 978-1-3990-9766-6.
- Kemp, Paul (1997). U-Boats Destroyed: German Submarine Losses in the World Wars. London: Arms & Armour Press. ISBN 1-85409-321-5.
- Lenton, H. T. (1970). British Fleet and Escort Destroyers: Volume One. London: Macdonald & Co. ISBN 0-356-02950-6.
- Patton, Brian (2007). Irish Sea Shipping. Kettering: Silver Link Publications. ISBN 978-1-85794-271-2.
- Manning, T. D.; Walker, C. F. (1959). British Warship Names. London: Putnam.
- Parkes, Oscar (1973) [First published 1931 by Sampson Low, Marston & Company, Ltd., London]. Jane's Fighting Ships 1931. Newton Abbot, UK: Davis & Charles (Publishers) Limited. ISBN 0-7153-5849-9.
- Preston, Antony (1971). 'V & W' Class Destroyers 1917–1945. London: Macdonald. OCLC 464542895.
- Rohwer, Jürgen; Hümmelchen, Gerhard (1992). Chronology of the War at Sea 1939–1945. London: Greenhill Books. ISBN 1-85367-117-7.
- Ruegg, Bob; Hague, Arnold (1993). Convoys to Russia 1941–1945. Kendal, UK. ISBN 0-905617-66-5.
- Winser, John de S. (2002). British Invasion Fleets: The Mediterranean and beyond 1942–1945. Gravesend, UK: World Ship Society. ISBN 0-9543310-0-1.
- Winser, John de S. (1994). The D-Day Ships: Neptune: the Greatest Amphibious Operation in History. Kendal, UK: World Ship Society. ISBN 0-905617-75-4.
