= Italian submarine Tricheco =

Tricheco (Italian for Walrus) was the name of at least two ships of the Italian Navy and may refer to:

- Italian submarine Tricheco (1909), a Glauco-class submarine launched in 1909 and discarded in 1918.
- Italian submarine Tricheco (1930), a Squalo-class submarine launched in 1930 and sunk in 1942.
