= Italian submarine Squalo (1930) =

Squalo-class submarine of the Regia Marina

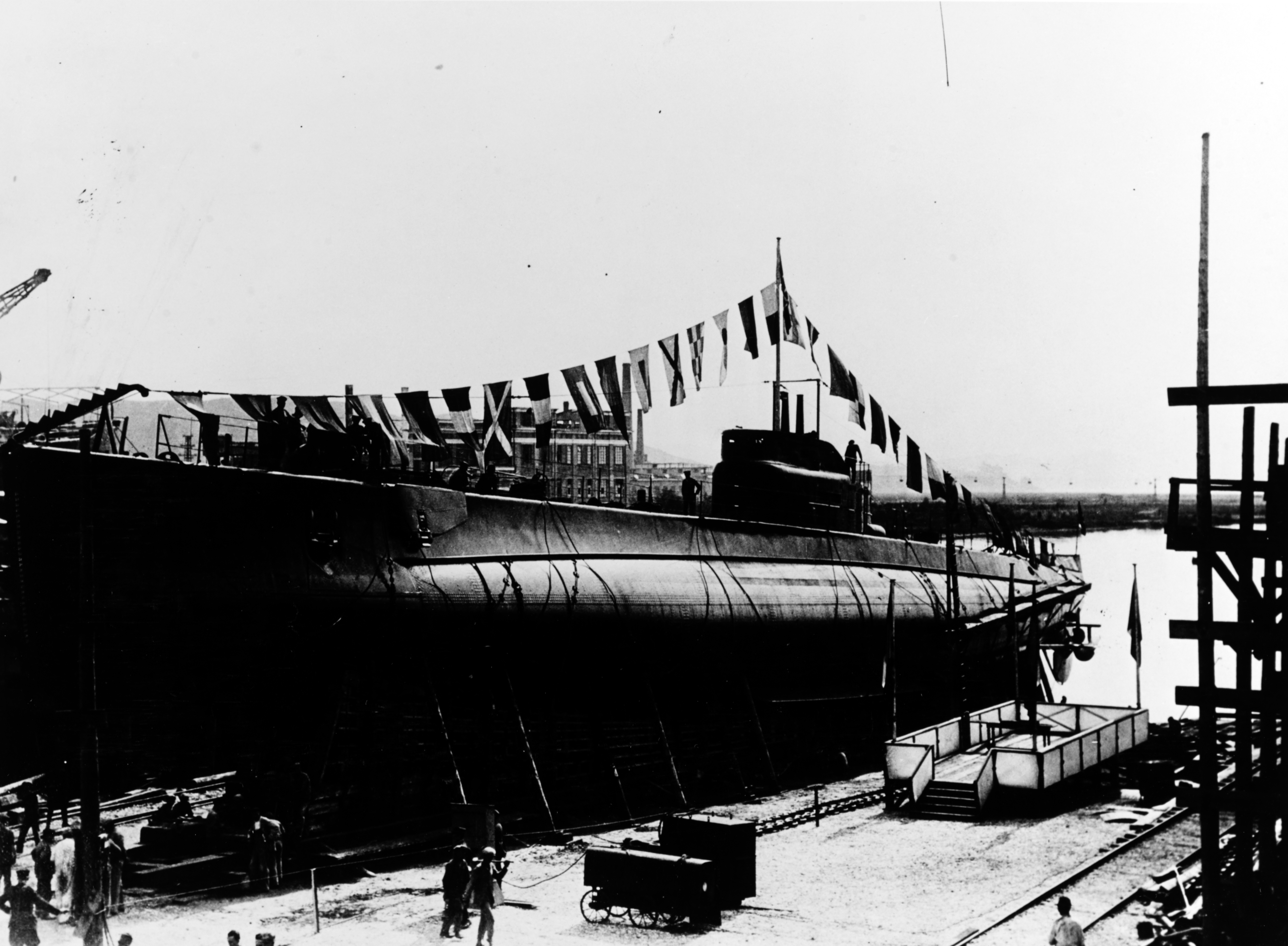
- Sister ship Tricheco before her christening ceremony

History

Italy
- Name: Squalo
- Namesake: Shark
- Builder: CRDA
- Laid down: 10 October 1928
- Launched: 15 January 1930
- Commissioned: 10 October 1931
- Stricken: 1 February 1948

General characteristics
- Class & type: Squalo-class submarine
- Displacement: 920 t (905 long tons) (surfaced); 1,125 t (1,107 long tons) (submerged)
- Length: 69.8 m (229 ft)
- Beam: 7.21 m (23 ft 8 in)
- Draft: 5.19 m (17 ft)
- Installed power: 3,000 bhp (2,200 kW) (diesels); 1,300 bhp (970 kW) (electric motors)
- Propulsion: 2 shafts; diesel-electric; 2 × diesel engines; 2 × electric motors
- Speed: 15.1 knots (28.0 km/h; 17.4 mph) (surfaced); 8 knots (15 km/h; 9.2 mph) (submerged)
- Range: 5,650 nmi (10,460 km; 6,500 mi) at 8 knots (15 km/h; 9.2 mph) (surfaced); 100 nmi (190 km; 120 mi) at 3 knots (5.6 km/h; 3.5 mph) (submerged)
- Test depth: 90 m (300 ft)
- Complement: 53
- Armament: 8 × 533 mm (21 in) torpedo tubes (4 bow, 4 stern); 1 × 102 mm (4 in) deck gun; 2 × single 13.2 mm (0.52 in) machine guns

Squalo was the lead ship of her class of four submarines built for the Regia Marina (Royal Italian Navy) during the late 1920s. The boat served in World War II and was decommissioned in 1948.

== Design and description ==
The Squalo-class submarines were essentially repeats of the preceding Bandiera class. They displaced 920 metric tons (910 long tons) surfaced and 1,125 metric tons (1,107 long tons) submerged. The submarines were 69.8 meters (229 ft) long, had a beam of 7.21 meters (23 ft 8 in) and a draft of 5.19 meters (17 ft). They had an operational diving depth of 90 meters (300 ft). Their crew numbered 53 officers and enlisted men.

For surface running, the boats were powered by two 1,500-brake-horsepower (1,119 kW) diesel engines, each driving one propeller shaft. When submerged each propeller was driven by a 650-brake-horsepower (485 kW) electric motor. They could reach 15.1 knots (28.0 km/h; 17.4 mph) on the surface and 8 knots (15 km/h; 9.2 mph) underwater. On the surface, the Squalo class had a range of 5,650 nautical miles (10,460 km; 6,500 mi) at 8 knots (15 km/h; 9.2 mph), submerged, they had a range of 100 nmi (190 km; 120 mi) at 3 knots (5.6 km/h; 3.5 mph).

The boats were armed with eight internal 53.3 cm (21 in) torpedo tubes, four each in the bow and stern. They carried a total of a dozen torpedoes. They were also armed with one 102 mm (4 in) deck gun for combat on the surface. Their anti-aircraft armament consisted of two 13.2 mm (0.52 in) machine guns.

== Construction and career ==
Squalo, named for the shark, was laid down on 10 October 1928 at the Cantieri Riuniti dell'Adriatico (CRDA) shipyard at Monfalcone. She was launched on 15 January 1930 and completed on 10 October.

== See also ==
Italian submarines of World War II

== Bibliography ==
- Bagnasco, Erminio (1977). Submarines of World War Two. Annapolis, Maryland: Naval Institute Press. ISBN 0-87021-962-6.
- Brescia, Maurizio (2012). Mussolini's Navy: A Reference Guide to the Regina Marina 1930–45. Annapolis, Maryland: Naval Institute Press. ISBN 978-1-59114-544-8.
- Chesneau, Roger, ed. (1980). Conway's All the World's Fighting Ships 1922–1946. Greenwich, UK: Conway Maritime Press. ISBN 0-85177-146-7.
- Fraccaroli, Aldo (1968). Italian Warships of World War II. Shepperton, UK: Ian Allan. ISBN 0-7110-0002-6.
- Rohwer, Jürgen (2005). Chronology of the War at Sea 1939–1945: The Naval History of World War Two (Third Revised ed.). Annapolis, Maryland: Naval Institute Press. ISBN 1-59114-119-2.
