= Italian submarine Durbo =

Italian submarine

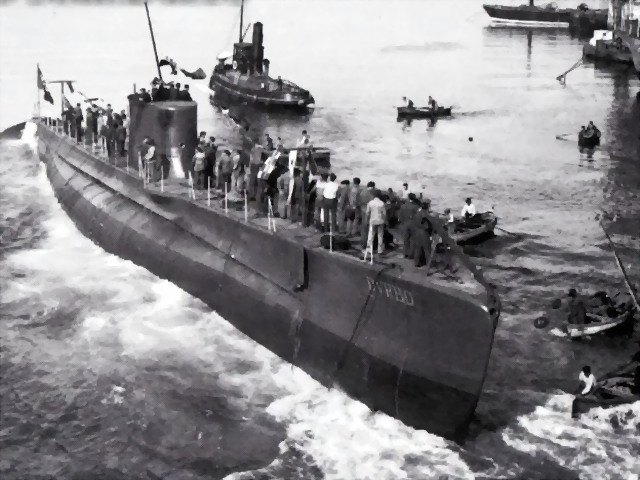

History

Kingdom of Italy
- Name: Durbo
- Namesake: Durba
- Builder: OTO
- Laid down: 8 March 1937
- Launched: 6 March 1938
- Commissioned: 1 July 1938
- Fate: Scuttled, 18 October 1940

General characteristics
- Class & type: 600-Serie Adua-class submarine
- Displacement: 680 long tons (691 t) surfaced; 844 long tons (858 t) submerged
- Length: 60.18 m (197 ft 5 in)
- Beam: 6.45 m (21 ft 2 in)
- Draft: 4.7 m (15 ft 5 in)
- Installed power: 1,200 bhp (890 kW) (diesels); 800 hp (600 kW) (electric motors)
- Propulsion: Diesel-electric; 2 × FIAT diesel engines; 2 × Marelli electric motors
- Speed: 14 knots (26 km/h; 16 mph) surfaced; 7.5 knots (13.9 km/h; 8.6 mph) submerged
- Range: 3,180 nmi (5,890 km; 3,660 mi) at 10.5 knots (19.4 km/h; 12.1 mph) surfaced; 74 nmi (137 km; 85 mi) at 4 knots (7.4 km/h; 4.6 mph) submerged
- Test depth: 80 m (260 ft)
- Complement: 44 (4 officers + 40 non-officers and sailors)
- Armament: 6 × 533 mm (21 in) torpedo tubes (4 bow, 2 stern); 1 × 100 mm (4 in) / 47 caliber deck gun; 2 x 1 – 13.2 mm (0.52 in) anti-aircraft guns

Italian submarine Durbo was an Adua-class submarine built for the Royal Italian Navy (Regia Marina) during the 1930s. It was named after a town of Durba in Ethiopia.

== Design and description ==
The Adua-class submarines were essentially repeats of the preceding Perla class. They displaced 680 long tons (690 t) surfaced and 844 long tons (858 t) submerged. The submarines were 60.18 meters (197 ft 5 in) long, had a beam of 6.45 meters (21 ft 2 in) and a draft of 4.7 meters (15 ft 5 in).

For surface running, the boats were powered by two 600-brake-horsepower (447 kW) diesel engines, each driving one propeller shaft. When submerged each propeller was driven by a 400-horsepower (298 kW) electric motor. They could reach 14 knots (26 km/h; 16 mph) on the surface and 7.5 knots (13.9 km/h; 8.6 mph) underwater. On the surface, the Adua class had a range of 3,180 nautical miles (5,890 km; 3,660 mi) at 10.5 knots (19.4 km/h; 12.1 mph), submerged, they had a range of 74 nmi (137 km; 85 mi) at 4 knots (7.4 km/h; 4.6 mph).

The boats were armed with six internal 53.3 cm (21.0 in) torpedo tubes, four in the bow and two in the stern. They were also armed with one 100 mm (4 in) deck gun for combat on the surface. The light anti-aircraft armament consisted of one or two pairs of 13.2 mm (0.52 in) machine guns.

== Construction and career ==
Durbo was launched on 6 March 1938 in OTO's shipyard in La Spezia and commissioned on 1 July that year. In August 1938 she was assigned to Leros. Durbo spent about a year engaged in exercises between Rhodes and Leros before returning to Italy.

Durbo, under command of captain Armando Acanfora, with her sisters Beilul and Tembien formed 35th Squadron (III Submarine Group) based in Messina. On 9 June 1940 she left the base for an offensive mission in the Gulf of Hammamet.

On 16 June 1940, at 6:10, at the point 34°06′N 11°33′E (in the Gulf of Hammamet about 44 miles southwest of Pantelleria), while proceeding to her patrol area, Durbo launched a couple of torpedoes at a small unit (perhaps a corvette, or a French destroyer), hearing a violent detonation after two minutes, but the rough seas made it impossible to verify whether the ship had been hit. There is no information about any ships being damaged or sunk in this area on this date.

For the next several months Durbo went on several more patrols around Malta and Pantelleria but without any success.

On 9 October 1940 Durbo, still under command of captain Acanfora, sailed from Messina to her newly assigned area of operations, about seventy miles East of Gibraltar. On 12 October 1940 she reached her assigned area near the island of Alboran south of Málaga and commenced patrolling in anticipation of a British convoy that she was supposed to report on. Durbo patrolled the area until 18 October, and sighted several ships, including a British destroyer on 17 October, but didn't attack any of the sighted targets.

In the early morning of 18 October, while on the surface, captain Acanfora learned that the submarine had developed an oil leak, and ordered the crew to fix the problem as quickly as possible. A few hours later, with the sun out, and the crew sure that the leak had been repaired, Durbo submerged to about 100 feet (30 m). At 17:25 a Saro London flying boat of 202 Squadron RAF, piloted by Captain Percy R. Hatfield, sighted air bubbles and a small patch of oil while flying off the island of Alboran, 65 miles East of the Strait of Gibraltar. Durbo just detected a ship, and rose up to periscope depth to observe her potential target. Around 17:50 together with a second 202 Squadron London, piloted by Captain Norman F. Eagleton, Hatfield dropped bombs at the location of the bubbles and the oil. The bombs dropped by the aircraft exploded but had not damaged Durbo, but forced the submarine to dive down to 100 feet (30 m) to avoid further attacks by the aircraft. The ship detected by Durbo was one of the British destroyers, HMS Firedrake or HMS Wrestler, patrolling nearby. After a lookout on HMS Firedrake had observed the reconnaissance planes dive and release bombs, both ships rushed in to close in on the area of attack, and soon established a contact on ASDIC. Durbo dove down to about 200 feet (61 m) trying to break off the attackers, and then submerged even deeper, to 400 feet (120 m). The pressure strained the steel plates which increased oil leak, making the submarine's position even more visible to destroyers. The depth charges set at 350 feet (110 m) were dropped, resulting in a large air bubble rising to the surface, possibly damaging the submarine's air supply system. After another attack, the submarine rose rapidly to the surface and was fired upon by HMS Wrestler. The submarine dove down, and another depth charge attack followed. After about 50 depth charges were dropped by both destroyers, at around 19:30, the submarine surfaced again, and was immediately fired upon by both destroyers. One shell hit the conning tower, forcing the crew to start abandoning the boat.

Durbo sank stern first at 19:50 on 18 October 1940, at the point 35°57′N 04°00′W with all 46 men of her crew (5 officers and 41 non-officers and sailors) rescued by HMS Firedrake.

Before Durbo went under, a British boarding party made up of men from HMS Firedrake and HMS Wrestler went on board. They got down into control room, and managed to grab codes and operational orders which were not destroyed. The capture of secret documents had a fatal short-term outcome: they shown the location of other Italian submarines, and just two days later, on 20 October 1940, a group of British destroyers would set a trap to Lafolè whose location was revealed by the captured documents. Lafolè was sunk after a hard chase, leaving only nine survivors.
