= Italian submarine Delfino (1930) =

Squalo-class submarine of the Regia Marina

Coordinates: 40°00′N 17°00′E

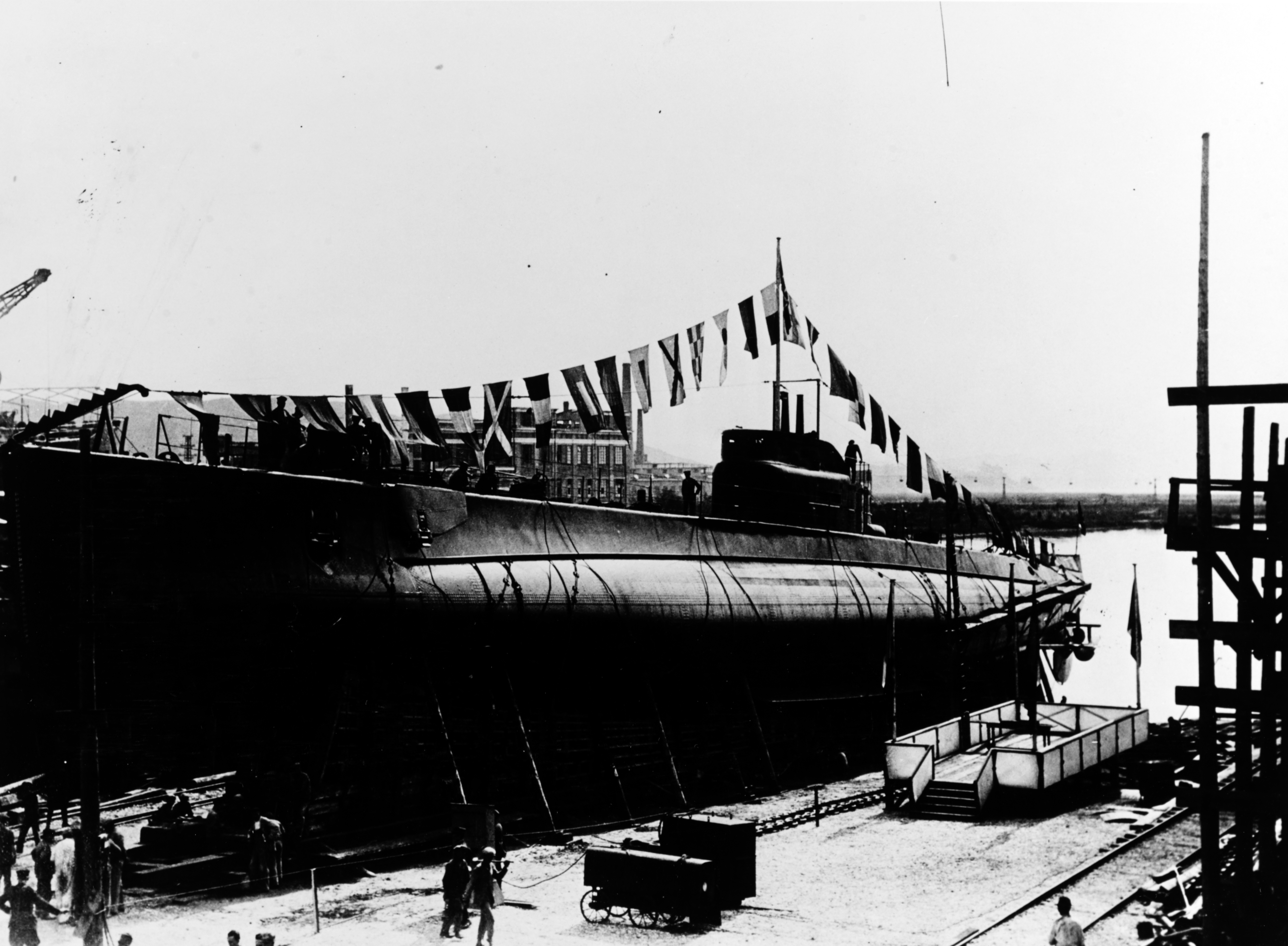
- Sister ship Tricheco before her christening ceremony

History

Italy
- Name: Delfino
- Namesake: Dolphin
- Builder: CRDA
- Laid down: 27 October 1928
- Launched: 27 April 1930
- Commissioned: 19 June 1931
- Fate: Sank after a collision, 23 March 1943

General characteristics
- Class & type: Squalo-class submarine
- Displacement: 920 t (905 long tons) (surfaced); 1,125 t (1,107 long tons) (submerged)
- Length: 69.8 m (229 ft)
- Beam: 7.21 m (23 ft 8 in)
- Draft: 5.19 m (17 ft)
- Installed power: 3,000 bhp (2,200 kW) (diesels); 1,300 bhp (970 kW) (electric motors)
- Propulsion: 2 shafts; diesel-electric; 2 × diesel engines; 2 × electric motors
- Speed: 15.1 knots (28.0 km/h; 17.4 mph) (surfaced); 8 knots (15 km/h; 9.2 mph) (submerged)
- Range: 5,650 nmi (10,460 km; 6,500 mi) at 8 knots (15 km/h; 9.2 mph) (surfaced); 100 nmi (190 km; 120 mi) at 3 knots (5.6 km/h; 3.5 mph) (submerged)
- Test depth: 90 m (300 ft)
- Complement: 53
- Armament: 8 × 533 mm (21 in) torpedo tubes (4 bow, 4 stern); 1 × 102 mm (4 in) deck gun; 2 × single 13.2 mm (0.52 in) machine guns

Delfino was one of four Squalo-class submarines built for the Regia Marina (Royal Italian Navy) during the late 1920s. The boat served in World War II and was sunk in 1943 after a collision with another Italian ship.

== Design and description ==
The Squalo-class submarines were essentially repeats of the preceding Bandiera class. They displaced 920 metric tons (910 long tons) surfaced and 1,125 metric tons (1,107 long tons) submerged. The submarines were 69.8 meters (229 ft) long, had a beam of 7.21 meters (23 ft 8 in) and a draft of 5.19 meters (17 ft). They had an operational diving depth of 90 meters (300 ft). Their crew numbered 53 officers and enlisted men.

For surface running, the boats were powered by two 1,500-brake-horsepower (1,119 kW) diesel engines, each driving one propeller shaft. When submerged each propeller was driven by a 650-brake-horsepower (485 kW) electric motor. They could reach 15.1 knots (28.0 km/h; 17.4 mph) on the surface and 8 knots (15 km/h; 9.2 mph) underwater. On the surface, the Squalo class had a range of 5,650 nautical miles (10,460 km; 6,500 mi) at 8 knots (15 km/h; 9.2 mph), submerged, they had a range of 100 nmi (190 km; 120 mi) at 3 knots (5.6 km/h; 3.5 mph).

The boats were armed with eight internal 53.3 cm (21 in) torpedo tubes, four each in the bow and stern. They carried a total of a dozen torpedoes. They were also armed with one 102 mm (4 in) deck gun for combat on the surface. Their anti-aircraft armament consisted of two 13.2 mm (0.52 in) machine guns.

== Construction and career ==
Delfino, named for the dolphin, was laid down on 27 October 1928 at the Cantieri Riuniti dell'Adriatico (CRDA) shipyard at Monfalcone. She was launched on 27 April 1930 and completed on 19 June 1931. After entering service the boat made two long cruises; to the Black Sea in 1933, and to the eastern Mediterranean in 1934. In December 1936 she patrolled the eastern coast of Spain during Spanish Civil War, making one failed attack against a merchant ship. In 1937, following the Second Italo-Ethiopian War, Delfino was sent to operate in the Red Sea, returning to Messina the following year.

After the entry of Italy into the Second World War in June 1940, Delfino operated in the Aegean Sea. On 15 August 1940 Delfino it was involved in a disgraceful incident during which it torpedoed and sank the neutral, at the time, Elli, which was at anchor off Tinos, attending the Virgin Mary celebrations as honour guard. The Greeks had been concerned that the old modernized light cruiser/minelayer Elli would be vulnerable following a number of unprovoked bombing attacks by Italian aircraft on Greek naval vessels, during that summer. However, the prevailing view was that this Holy day, being also a Holy day for Catholic Italians, as it was for Orthodox Greeks, would weigh against any attack. According to Italy's Foreign Minister, Count Ciano, the attack, ordered by Mussolini, was intended to intimidate the Greeks, who were neutral, but had, in view of earlier attacks, recently (April 1940) accepted British guarantees against the Axis. The Italian government denied Greek accusations of mounting the attack, but the Greeks recovered fragments of the torpedoes, and proved them to be of Italian origin. The Italians in turn accused the British of making the attack using torpedoes bought before the war. The operation succeeded only in uniting Greeks, solidifying their response to Italy's ultimatum two months later (October 28). After the war, when Greece received the Eugenio di Savoia as war reparations, it was renamed Elli.

On 29 November 1940, in the northern Aegean, Delfino fired two torpedoes at a convoy, and reported that the Psara had been hit, but this was never confirmed. On 1 August 1941, on patrol off Tobruk, Delfino was attacked by a British Short Sunderland aircraft of 230 Squadron, and succeeded in shooting it down, and rescuing four men from the crew of twelve. Following further patrols around Sicily and Malta, in February 1942, Delfino was assigned to the Submarine School at Pula for training missions. She returned to active duty in November 1942, based at Taranto, carrying out three transport missions to North Africa, taking over 200 tons of ammunition and fuel. She was then refitted between January and March 1943. On 23 March 1943 Delfino sank an hour after leaving Taranto, after colliding with her escort boat, with the loss of 28 crew.

== See also ==
Italian submarines of World War II

== Bibliography ==
- Bagnasco, Erminio (1977). Submarines of World War Two. Annapolis, Maryland: Naval Institute Press. ISBN 0-87021-962-6.
- Brescia, Maurizio (2012). Mussolini's Navy: A Reference Guide to the Regina Marina 1930–45. Annapolis, Maryland: Naval Institute Press. ISBN 978-1-59114-544-8.
- Chesneau, Roger, ed. (1980). Conway's All the World's Fighting Ships 1922–1946. Greenwich, UK: Conway Maritime Press. ISBN 0-85177-146-7.
- Fraccaroli, Aldo (1968). Italian Warships of World War II. Shepperton, UK: Ian Allan. ISBN 0-7110-0002-6.
- Rohwer, Jürgen (2005). Chronology of the War at Sea 1939–1945: The Naval History of World War Two (Third Revised ed.). Annapolis, Maryland: Naval Institute Press. ISBN 1-59114-119-2.
