= Squalo-class submarine =

Italian submarine class

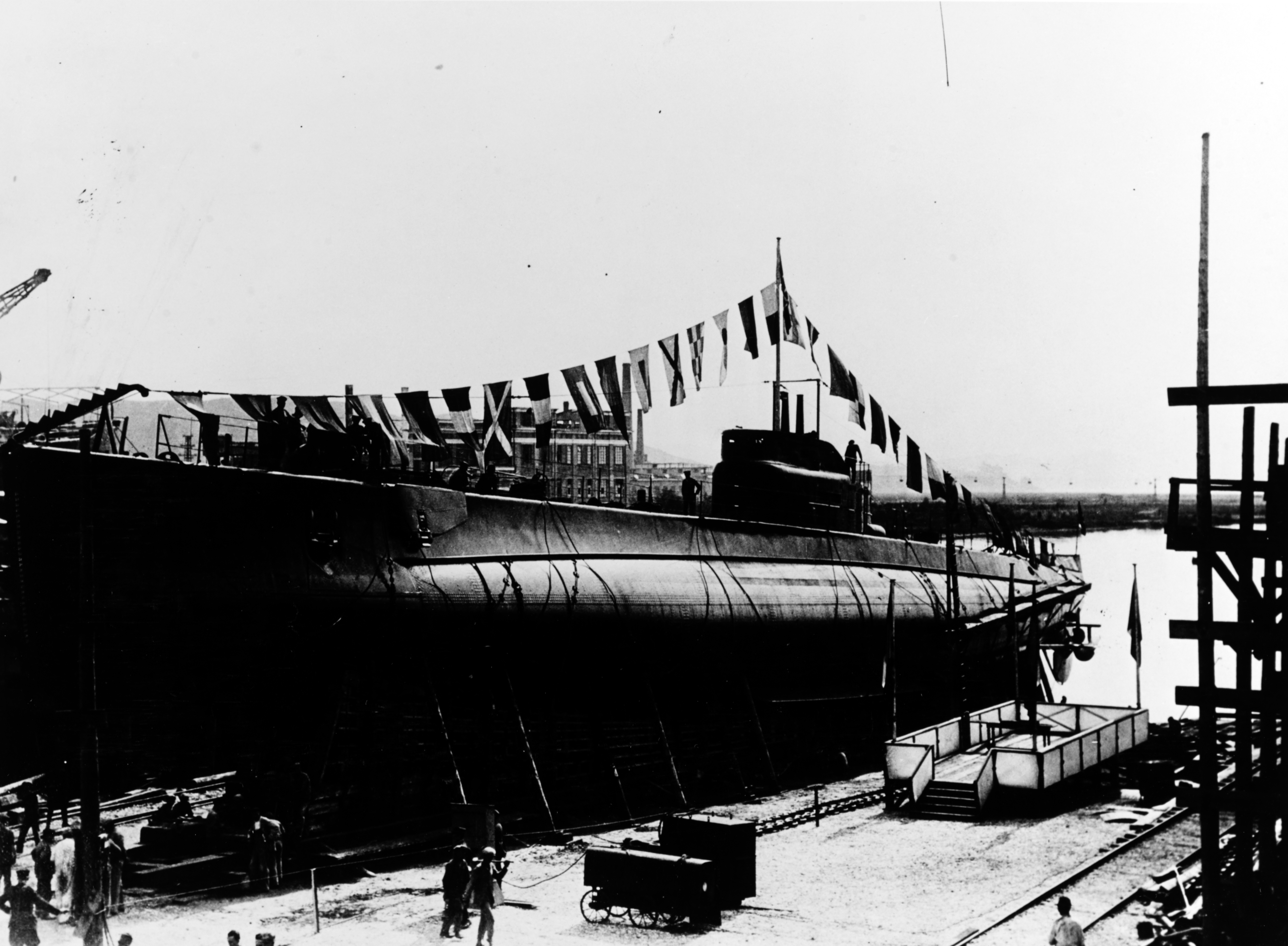
- Tricheco before her christening ceremony, 11 September 1920

Class overview
- Name: Squalo class
- Builders: CRDA
- Operators: Regia Marina
- Preceded by: Bandiera class
- Succeeded by: Glauco class
- Built: 1928–1930
- In commission: 1930–1943
- Completed: 4
- Lost: 3
- Scrapped: 1

General characteristics
- Type: Submarine
- Displacement: 920 t (905 long tons) (surfaced); 1,125 t (1,107 long tons) (submerged)
- Length: 69.8 m (229 ft)
- Beam: 7.21 m (23 ft 8 in)
- Draft: 5.19 m (17 ft)
- Installed power: 3,000 bhp (2,200 kW) (diesels); 1,300 bhp (970 kW) (electric motors)
- Propulsion: 2 shafts; diesel-electric; 2 × diesel engines; 2 × electric motors
- Speed: 15.1 knots (28.0 km/h; 17.4 mph) (surfaced); 8 knots (15 km/h; 9.2 mph) (submerged)
- Range: 5,650 nmi (10,460 km; 6,500 mi) at 8 knots (15 km/h; 9.2 mph) (surfaced); 100 nmi (190 km; 120 mi) at 3 knots (5.6 km/h; 3.5 mph) (submerged)
- Test depth: 90 m (300 ft)
- Complement: 53
- Armament: 8 × 533 mm (21 in) torpedo tubes (4 bow, 4 stern); 1 × 102 mm (4 in) deck gun; 2 × single 13.2 mm (0.52 in) machine guns

The Squalo-class submarines were a group of four submarines built for the Royal Italian Navy (Regia Marina) during the 1930s. They were built at the Cantieri Riuniti dell'Adriatico (CRDA) shipyard at Monfalcone, and designed by Curio Bernardis.

== Design and description ==
The Squalo-class submarines were essentially repeats of the preceding Bandiera class. They shared that design's problems with stability and seakeeping and required the same bulging of the hull to rectify the problems. They displaced 920 metric tons (910 long tons) surfaced and 1,125 metric tons (1,107 long tons) submerged. The submarines were 69.8 meters (229 ft) long, had a beam of 7.21 meters (23 ft 8 in) and a draft of 5.19 meters (17 ft). They had an operational diving depth of 90 meters (300 ft). Their crew numbered 53 officers and enlisted men.

For surface running, the boats were powered by two 1,500-brake-horsepower (1,119 kW) diesel engines, each driving one propeller shaft. When submerged each propeller was driven by a 650-brake-horsepower (485 kW) electric motor. They could reach 15.1 knots (28.0 km/h; 17.4 mph) on the surface and 8 knots (15 km/h; 9.2 mph) underwater. On the surface, the Squalo class had a range of 5,650 nautical miles (10,460 km; 6,500 mi) at 8 knots (15 km/h; 9.2 mph), submerged, they had a range of 100 nmi (190 km; 120 mi) at 3 knots (5.6 km/h; 3.5 mph).

The boats were armed with eight internal 53.3 cm (21 in) torpedo tubes, four each in the bow and stern. They carried a total of a dozen torpedoes. They were also armed with one 102 mm (4 in) deck gun for combat on the surface. Their anti-aircraft armament consisted of two 13.2 mm (0.52 in) machine guns.

== Ships ==
- Delfino (English: Dolphin), sank after a collision off Taranto, 23 March 1943.
- Narvalo (English: Narwhal), sunk by the British destroyers Pakenham and Hursley, and RAF aircraft, in the Mediterranean Sea at 34°08′N 16°04′E, 14 January 1943.
- Squalo (English: Shark), withdrawn from service, 9 September 1943.
- Tricheco (English: Walrus), sunk by the British submarine Upholder off Brindisi in the Adriatic Sea at 40°45′N 17°56′E, 18 March 1942.

== See also ==
Italian submarines of World War II
