= HMS Hotspur (H01) =

H-class destroyer

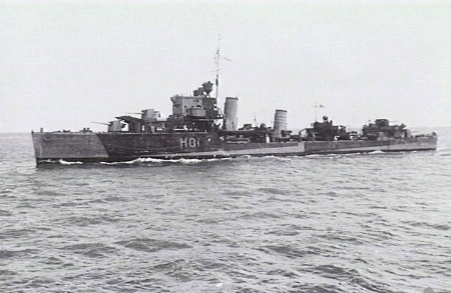

History

United Kingdom
- Name: HMS Hotspur
- Ordered: 13 December 1934
- Builder: Scotts Shipbuilding & Engineering Company, Greenock, Scotland
- Cost: £253,037
- Laid down: 27 February 1935
- Launched: 23 March 1936
- Completed: 29 December 1936
- Fate: Sold to the Dominican Republic, 23 November 1948
- Notes: Pennant number: H01

Dominican Republic
- Name: Trujillo
- Namesake: Rafael Trujillo
- Acquired: 23 November 1948
- Renamed: Duarte, 1962
- Fate: Sold for scrap, 1972
- Notes: Pennant number: D101

General characteristics as built
- Class & type: H-class destroyer
- Displacement: 1,350 long tons (1,370 t) (standard); 1,883 long tons (1,913 t) (deep load)
- Length: 323 ft (98.5 m)
- Beam: 33 ft (10.1 m)
- Draught: 12 ft 5 in (3.8 m)
- Installed power: 34,000 shp (25,000 kW)
- Propulsion: 2 shafts, Parsons geared steam turbines; 3 Admiralty 3-drum water-tube boilers
- Speed: 36 knots (67 km/h; 41 mph)
- Range: 5,530 nmi (10,240 km; 6,360 mi) at 15 knots (28 km/h; 17 mph)
- Complement: 137 (peacetime), 146 (wartime)
- Sensors & processing systems: ASDIC
- Armament: 4 × 1 - QF 4.7-inch (120 mm) Mk IX guns; 2 × 4 - .50 cal machine guns; 2 × 4 - 21 inch (533 mm) torpedo tubes; 20 × depth charges, 1 rail and 2 throwers

HMS Hotspur was an H-class destroyer built for the Royal Navy during the 1930s. During the Spanish Civil War of 1936–1939 the ship spent considerable time in Spanish waters, enforcing the arms blockade imposed by Britain and France on both sides of the conflict. During the Norwegian Campaign of the Second World War, she fought in the First Battle of Narvik in April 1940 where she was badly damaged. After her repairs were completed, Hotspur was transferred to Gibraltar where she participated in the Battle of Dakar in September. A month later the ship was badly damaged when she rammed and sank an Italian submarine. She received permanent repairs in Malta and was transferred to the Mediterranean Fleet when they were finished in early 1941. Hotspur participated in the Battle of Cape Matapan in March and evacuated British and Australian troops from both Greece and Crete in April–May. In June the ship participated in the Syria-Lebanon Campaign and was escorting convoys and the larger ships of the Mediterranean Fleet until she was transferred to the Eastern Fleet in March 1942.

Hotspur did not see any action during the Japanese Indian Ocean raid in April, but she did escort an aircraft carrier in September during the later stages of the invasion of Madagascar. In June 1942 the ship returned to the Mediterranean to escort another convoy to Malta (Operation Vigorous). She was converted to an escort destroyer beginning in March 1943 in the United Kingdom and was assigned to escort convoys in the North Atlantic for most of the rest of the war. After a lengthy refit in late 1944, Hotspur escorted convoys in the Irish Sea until the end of the Second World War in May 1945.

After the war the ship was used both as a training ship and on active duty until she was placed in reserve in early 1948. She was sold to the Dominican Republic late that year and renamed Trujillo. After the death of Rafael Trujillo, who ruled the Dominican Republic from 1930 until his assassination in 1961, the ship was renamed Duarte in 1962, and finally was sold for scrap in 1972.

== Description ==
Hotspur displaced 1,350 long tons (1,370 t) at standard load and 1,883 long tons (1,913 t) at deep load. The ship had an overall length of 323 feet (98.5 m), a beam of 33 feet (10.1 m) and a draught of 12 feet 5 inches (3.8 m). She was powered by Parsons geared steam turbines, driving two shafts, which developed a total of 34,000 shaft horsepower (25,000 kW) and gave a maximum speed of 36 knots (67 km/h; 41 mph). Steam for the turbines was provided by three Admiralty 3-drum water-tube boilers. Hotspur carried a maximum of 470 long tons (480 t) of fuel oil that gave her a range of 5,530 nautical miles (10,240 km; 6,360 mi) at 15 knots (28 km/h; 17 mph). The ship's complement was 137 officers and men in peacetime, but this increased to 146 in wartime.

The ship mounted four 45-calibre 4.7-inch (120 mm) Mark IX guns in single mounts. For anti-aircraft (AA) defence, Hotspur had two quadruple Mark I mounts for the 0.5 inch Vickers Mark III machine gun. She was fitted with two above-water quadruple torpedo tube mounts for 21-inch (533 mm) torpedoes. One depth charge rail and two throwers were fitted; 20 depth charges were originally carried, but this increased to 35 shortly after the war began.

Beginning in mid-1940, the ship's anti-aircraft armament was increased although when exactly the modifications were made is not known. The rear set of torpedo tubes was replaced by a 3-inch (76.2 mm) (12-pounder) AA gun and the quadruple .50-calibre Vickers mounts were replaced by 20-millimetre (0.8 in) Oerlikon autocannon. Two more Oerlikon guns were also added in the forward superstructure.

== Construction and service ==
Hotspur was laid down by Scotts Shipbuilding & Engineering Company, Greenock, Scotland on 27 February 1935, launched on 23 March 1936 and completed on 29 December 1936. Excluding government-furnished equipment like the armament, the ship cost £253,037. (Note: Adjusted for inflation to 2026 pounds, £15,559,122.) She was assigned to the 2nd Destroyer Flotilla of the Mediterranean Fleet upon commissioning. Hotspur patrolled Spanish waters in 1937 during the Spanish Civil War enforcing the policies of the Non-Intervention Committee. The ship received an overhaul at Gibraltar between 16 December 1937 and 17 January 1938. She resumed patrolling Spanish waters in 1938 and 1939. After the end of the Spanish Civil War, Hotspur began a refit in Sheerness Dockyard in August 1939, but this was cancelled later in the month as tensions rose just before the beginning of the Second World War.

=== Wartime career ===
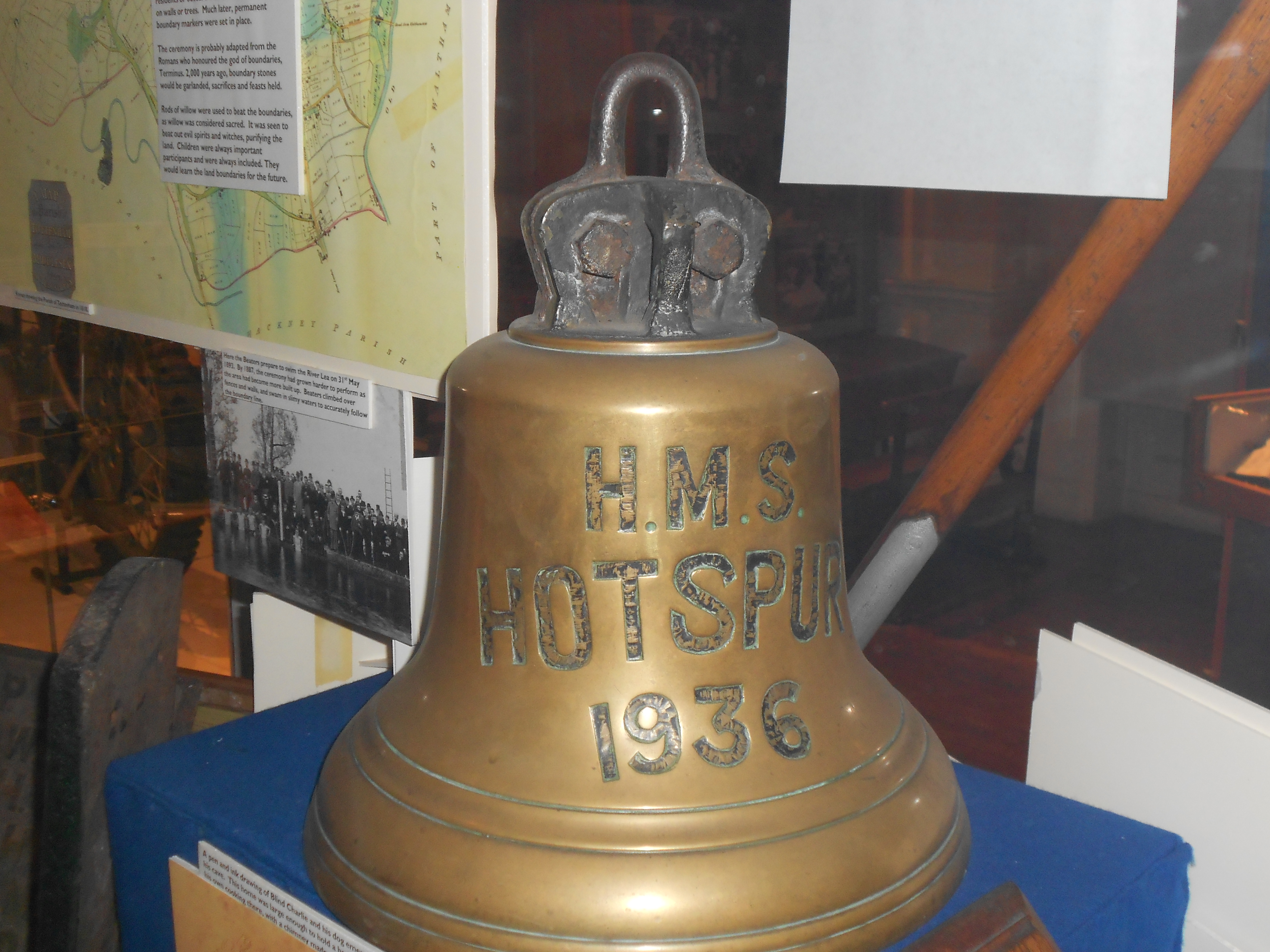
Hotspur's bell

She sailed later that month for the Mediterranean, but, once she reached Gibraltar, she was diverted to Freetown, Sierra Leone, to search for German commerce raiders. The ship was transferred to the North America and West Indies Station in October and was refitted in Sheerness between 18 January and 6 March 1940. On 6 April Hotspur and the rest of the 2nd Destroyer Flotilla escorted the four destroyer minelayers of the 20th Destroyer Flotilla as they sailed to implement Operation Wilfred, an operation to lay mines in the Vestfjord to prevent the transport of Swedish iron ore from Narvik to Germany. The mines were laid on the early morning of 8 April, before the Germans began their invasion, and the destroyers joined the battlecruiser Renown and her escorts.

During the First Battle of Narvik on 10 April the ship, together with her sister ship, Hostile, was initially deployed to secure the escape route of the other three destroyers of the 2nd Flotilla and deal with any captured coast defence guns. Hotspur did eventually move forward and fired four torpedoes into Narvik harbour, sinking at least two merchant ships. As the British ships were leaving the vicinity of Narvik they encountered five German destroyers at close range. Two of the German ships crossed the T of the British ships and quickly set Hardy on fire and forced her to run aground. Hunter eventually took the lead, but was severely damaged by the Germans, probably including one torpedo hit, and her speed dropped rapidly. Hotspur, immediately behind her, was temporarily out of control due to two hits and rammed her from behind. When the ships managed to disengage, Hunter capsized and Hotspur moved ahead slowly, engaged by all five German destroyers. Havock and Hostile had disengaged earlier, but came back to save Hotspur. Hostile laid a smoke screen that allowed Hotspur to escape while Havock engaged the German ships. Hostile escorted the badly damaged Hotspur to the repair base set up at Flakstadøya in the Lofoten Islands. During the battle the ship had been hit seven times by German shells which knocked out No. 2 boiler, all electrical circuits, her depth charges, her rangefinder and killed 18 of her crew. Temporary repairs allowed Hotspur to sail for Chatham Dockyard where she was repaired from 2 May to 16 July.

After her repairs were completed the ship was transferred to the 13th Destroyer Flotilla of the North Atlantic Command, based at Gibraltar. During Operation Hurry, Hotspur, and three other destroyers, escorted the aircraft carrier Argus to a position south-west of Sardinia so the carrier could fly off her Hawker Hurricane fighters to Malta on 2 August. On 11 September, the ship spotted the Vichy French cruisers Georges Leygues, Gloire and Montcalm and three escorting destroyers en route from Toulon to Gabon. She escorted the capital ships of Force H during the Battle of Dakar on 23 September, but was not engaged. On 20 October, Hotspur, the destroyer Griffin and her sister Gallant sank the Italian submarine Lafolè east of Gibraltar. The ship was badly damaged when she rammed the submarine and she was given temporary repairs at Gibraltar between 22 October and 20 November. She escorted a troop convoy from Gibraltar to Malta in late November during Operation Collar. Permanent repairs were made at Malta between 29 November and 20 February 1941.

After her repairs were completed, Hotspur was assigned to the 2nd Destroyer Flotilla of the Mediterranean Fleet. The ship escorted the capital ships of the Mediterranean Fleet during the Battle of Cape Matapan in March 1941. In mid-April she escorted the fast transport MV Breconshire and three battleships from Alexandria to Malta before going on to escort the battleships as they bombarded Tripoli on 20 April. After refuelling in Alexandria on 23 April, Hotspur sailed for Greece to begin evacuating British and Australian troops from the beaches. On 8 May, the ship again escorted the capital ships of the Mediterranean Fleet as they covered another convoy from Alexandria to Malta before being detached to escort the light cruiser Ajax as she bombarded Benghazi harbour on 7/8 May and sank two Italian merchant ships. During the evacuation of Crete Hotspur had to scuttle the destroyer Imperial on 29 May after the latter ship's steering had been disabled by a near miss by a bomb.

The ship escorted the LSI(L) Glengyle during the opening stage of the Syria-Lebanon Campaign of June 1941 and also hunted for French submarines. From July to November, Hotspur escorted convoys to Tobruk On 25 November, she was escorting the battleship Barham when that ship was torpedoed by German submarine U-331. Hotspur and the other escorting destroyers rescued 451 men. The ship escorted the light cruiser Naiad when she bombarded Derna in early December. While escorting a convoy, Hotspur and her sister, Hasty, sank U-79 on 23 December north of Sollum.

During a convoy to Malta in January 1942, the ship was detailed to escort the merchant ship Thermopylae to Benghazi when she started having engine trouble. Thermopylae was sunk by air attack on 19 January. On 23 March Hotspur was transferred to the Eastern Fleet in the Indian Ocean and was assigned to Force A of the fleet during the Indian Ocean raid by the Japanese in early April 1942. The ship returned to the Mediterranean to participate in Operation Vigorous, another convoy from Alexandria to Malta, in June. Hotspur was forced to sink her sister, Hasty, after the latter was damaged by a torpedo from German motor torpedo boat S-55. After the ship returned to the Indian Ocean, she escorted the carrier Illustrious when that ship supported operations on Madagascar in September. Hotspur remained in the Indian Ocean until January 1943 when she was transferred to Freetown, where she arrived on 14 February. The ship remained there only briefly before being transferred home to begin a conversion to an escort destroyer. The conversion began at Sheerness on 1 March and lasted until 31 May.

A Type 271 surface search radar replaced the fire-control director and rangefinder above the bridge. A Type 290 surface warning radar was added at the top of the foremast. A High frequency direction finding system was added on a pole mast aft. The ship also received a Type 242 IFF system. Two 4.7-inch guns were removed, one each forward and aft, and the forward gun was replaced by a Hedgehog anti-submarine spigot mortar. The 3-inch anti-aircraft gun amidships was also removed, but the number of 20 mm AA guns was increased to six.

Hotspur was assigned to Escort Group C4 in June after working up and escorted convoys in the North Atlantic. She was transferred to the 14th Escort Group in June 1944 and refitted in Barrow-in-Furness between 31 October and 9 March 1945. Escort duties in the Irish Sea followed until Victory in Europe Day. Sometime before this, the ship's Hedgehog was replaced by a 4.7-inch gun. Hotspur was briefly assigned to the Rosyth Escort Force before being transferred to the Derry Training Squadron in August.

=== Postwar ===
Hotspur was reassigned to the 4th Escort Group in June 1946 until she was refitted at Portsmouth Dockyard in February–March 1947. The ship was then assigned to the 3rd Escort Flotilla based at Portland Harbour. She was selected to be scrapped in November 1947 and was placed in reserve on 20 January 1948 pending disposal.

Hotspur was sold to the Dominican Republic on 23 November 1948 and renamed Trujillo. By this time the ship carried a Type 291 air warning radar and an American SG-1 surface search radar. Four Bofors 40-millimetre (1.6 in) guns replaced the 20 mm Oerlikons. In June 1953, she was one of a number of foreign warships to attend Queen Elizabeth II's Coronation Review at Spithead. After the death of Rafael Trujillo, the ship was renamed Duarte in 1962. She was sold for scrap in 1972.
