= HMS Gallant (H59) =

G-class destroyer

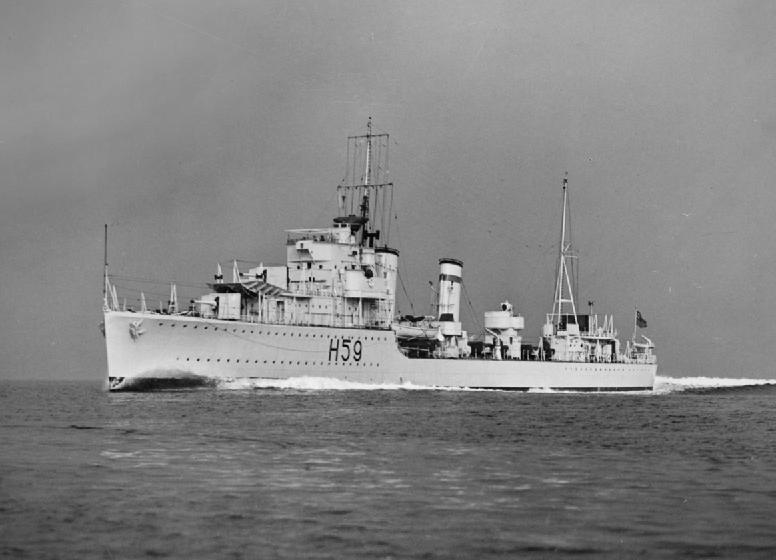
- Gallant in April 1938

History

United Kingdom
- Name: Gallant
- Ordered: 5 March 1934
- Builder: Alexander Stephen and Sons, Glasgow
- Laid down: 15 September 1934
- Launched: 26 September 1935
- Completed: 25 February 1936
- Identification: Pennant number: H59
- Motto: FIDE ET FORTITUDINE.
- Fate: Sunk as a blockship, September 1943
- Badge: Blue; a 17th century spur gold.

General characteristics (as built)
- Class & type: G-class destroyer
- Displacement: 1,350 long tons (1,370 t) (standard); 1,883 long tons (1,913 t) (deep load)
- Length: 323 ft (98.5 m)
- Beam: 33 ft (10.1 m)
- Draught: 12 ft 5 in (3.8 m)
- Installed power: 3 Admiralty 3-drum boilers; 34,000 shp (25,000 kW)
- Propulsion: 2 shafts, 2 geared steam turbines
- Speed: 36 knots (67 km/h; 41 mph)
- Range: 5,530 nmi (10,240 km; 6,360 mi) at 15 knots (28 km/h; 17 mph)
- Complement: 137 (peacetime), 146 (wartime)
- Sensors & processing systems: ASDIC
- Armament: 4 × single 4.7 in (120 mm) guns; 2 × quadruple 0.5 in (12.7 mm) machine guns; 2 × quadruple 21 in (533 mm) torpedo tubes; 20 × depth charges, 1 rail and 2 throwers

HMS Gallant (H59) was a G-class destroyer, built for the Royal Navy in the mid-1930s. During the Spanish Civil War of 1936–1939 the ship spent considerable time in Spanish waters, enforcing the arms blockade imposed by Britain and France on both sides of the conflict. Gallant was transferred from the Mediterranean Fleet shortly after the beginning of World War II to the British Isles, to escort shipping in local waters. She was slightly damaged by German aircraft during the evacuation of Allied troops from Dunkirk at the end of May 1940. Following repairs, Gallant was transferred to Gibraltar and served with Force H for several months. In November, the ship was transferred to the Mediterranean Fleet, where she escorted several convoys. She struck a mine in January 1941 and was towed to Malta for repairs. These were proved extensive and Gallant was further damaged by near-misses during an air raid in April 1942, before they were completed. The additional damage made the ship uneconomical to repair so she was scuttled as a blockship in 1943. Her wreck was broken up in 1953.

== Description ==
Gallant displaced 1,350 long tons (1,370 t) at standard load and 1,883 long tons (1,913 t) at deep load. The ship had an overall length of 323 feet (98.5 m), a beam of 33 feet (10.1 m) and a draught of 12 feet 5 inches (3.8 m). She was powered by Parsons geared steam turbines, driving two shafts, which developed a total of 34,000 shaft horsepower (25,000 kW) and gave a maximum speed of 36 knots (67 km/h; 41 mph). Steam for the turbines was provided by three Admiralty 3-drum water-tube boilers. Gallant carried a maximum of 470 long tons (480 t) of fuel oil that gave her a range of 5,530 nautical miles (10,240 km; 6,360 mi) at 15 knots (28 km/h; 17 mph). The ship's complement was 137 officers and men in peacetime, but it increased to 146 in wartime.

The ship mounted four 45-calibre 4.7-inch (120 mm) Mark IX guns in single mounts. For anti-aircraft defence Gallant had two quadruple Mark I mounts for the 0.5 inch Vickers Mark III machine gun. She was fitted with two above-water quadruple torpedo tube mounts for 21-inch (533 mm) torpedoes. One rail and two depth charge throwers were fitted; 20 depth charges were originally carried, but this increased to 35 shortly after the war began.

== Service ==
Gallant was laid down by Alexander Stephen and Sons in Glasgow, Scotland, on 15 September 1934, launched on 26 September 1935 and completed on 25 February 1936. Excluding government-furnished equipment like the armament, the ship cost £252,920. She was assigned to the 1st Destroyer Flotilla of the Mediterranean Fleet upon commissioning. Gallant patrolled Spanish waters during the Spanish Civil War enforcing the edicts of the Non-Intervention Committee. She pulled off a Spanish merchantman that had grounded between Almeria and Málaga on 20 December 1936. The ship was attacked by a Spanish Nationalist aircraft off Cape San Antonio on 6 April 1937, but was not damaged. The next month she returned to Great Britain for an overhaul at Sheerness between 31 May and 21 July 1937.

When World War II began in September 1939, Gallant was in the Mediterranean, but she and her entire flotilla were transferred to the Western Approaches Command at Plymouth in October. After a boiler cleaning, the ship was reassigned at the end of the month to the Nore Command in Harwich for patrol and escort duties. On 2 February 1940 Gallant and her sister ship, Griffin, rescued the crew from the oil tanker British Councillor which was sinking after it had struck a mine. Gallant took over escorting Convoy HN 12 after the destroyer Duchess was sunk on 18 February and she rescued 12 survivors from the Swedish ship Santos near Duncansby Head a week later. On 20 March 1940 she escorted the armed merchant cruisers Cilicia and Carinthia after they collided. The ship was refitted at Southampton between 28 March and 30 April and rejoined her flotilla at Harwich the next day. During the evening of 9/10 May, Gallant and the destroyer Bulldog rescued most of the crew of the destroyer Kelly after the latter ship was torpedoed by a German E-boat in the North Sea.

While Gallant was participating in the Dunkirk evacuation, a near miss by a bomb on 29 May knocked out her steering and caused minor damage to her hull and electrical systems. She was repaired at Hull and encountered a German mine-laying sortie on the evening of 5/6 June off Lowestoft when in company with the destroyer Walpole. Later in June the ship was refitted in Chatham Dockyard with a 12-pounder 3-inch (76 mm) anti-aircraft gun that replaced the rear torpedo tube mount.

After her refit Gallant was transferred to the 13th Destroyer Flotilla of the North Atlantic Command, arriving at Gibraltar on 30 July. On her voyage south the ship escorted the aircraft carrier Argus which was loaded with a dozen Hawker Hurricane fighters. During Operation Hurry, Gallant, and three other destroyers, escorted Argus to a position south-west of Sardinia so the carrier could fly off her Hurricanes to Malta on 2 August. After her return to Gibraltar the ship was transferred to Force H. On 20 October, Gallant, her sister Griffin and the destroyer Hotspur sank the Italian submarine Lafolè east of Gibraltar. The ship escorted the battleship Barham and the cruisers Berwick and Glasgow during Operation Coat in early November as they joined the Mediterranean Fleet. Gallant herself was transferred to the 14th Destroyer Flotilla at Malta on 10 November. She participated in the inconclusive Battle of Cape Spartivento on 27 November during Operation Collar.

On 10 January 1941, during Operation Excess, the Italian torpedo boats Circe and Vega attempted an attack on the Allied convoy off Pantellaria. Right after the engagement, in which Vega was sunk, Gallant struck a mine that detonated her forward magazine, because the Italian action pushed the British convoy too much south of their pre-established route, toward the northern tip of the Italian minefield 7 AN. The explosion blew the bow off the ship, killing 65 and injuring 15 more of her crew. Her sister Griffin rescued most of the survivors and the destroyer HMS Mohawk towed her stern-first to Malta. The ship was slowly repaired and in October 1941 it was estimated that they would be completed in June 1942. However, on 5 April 1942, she was extensively damaged by bomb splinters by an air raid on Valletta and had to be beached at Pinto's Wharf to prevent her from sinking. She was judged to be a constructive total loss and any usable equipment was stripped from her hulk. Gallant was expended as a blockship at St Paul's Island in September 1943, with the wreck being broken up in 1953.
