= Italian submarine Lafolè =

Italian submarine

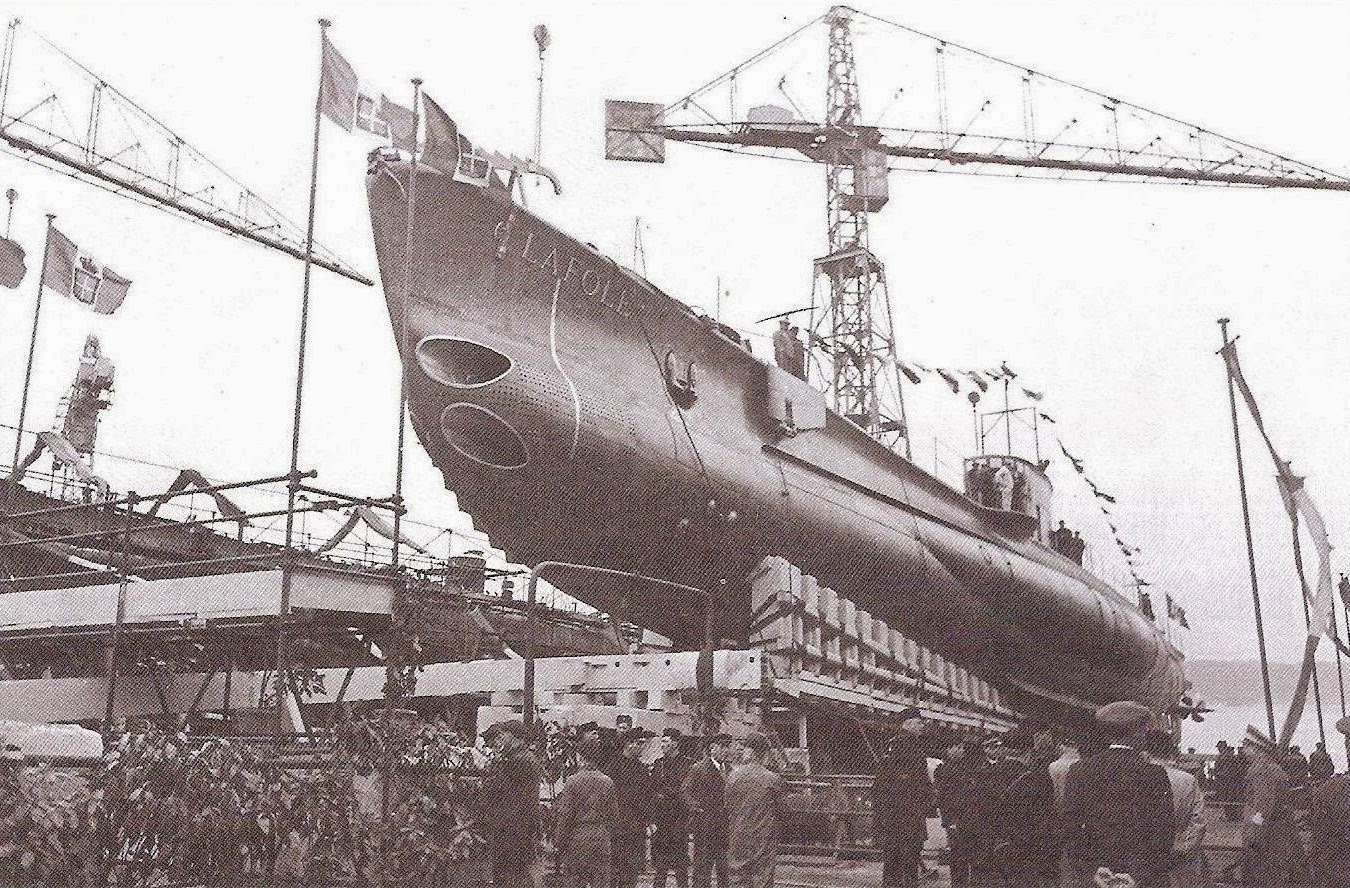
- RIN Lafolè

History

Kingdom of Italy
- Name: Lafolè
- Builder: OTO, Muggiano
- Laid down: 30 June 1937
- Launched: 10 April 1938
- Commissioned: 13 August 1938
- Fate: Sunk, 20 October 1940

General characteristics
- Class & type: 600-Serie Adua-class submarine
- Displacement: 680 long tons (691 t) surfaced; 844 long tons (858 t) submerged
- Length: 60.28 m (197 ft 9 in)
- Beam: 6.45 m (21 ft 2 in)
- Draught: 4.64 m (15 ft 3 in)
- Installed power: 1,400 hp (1,000 kW) (diesels); 800 hp (600 kW) (electric motors)
- Propulsion: Diesel-electric; 2 × FIAT diesel engines; 2 × Marelli electric motors
- Speed: 14 knots (26 km/h; 16 mph) surfaced; 7.5 knots (13.9 km/h; 8.6 mph) submerged
- Range: 3,180 nmi (5,890 km; 3,660 mi) at 10.5 kn (19.4 km/h; 12.1 mph) surfaced; 74 nmi (137 km; 85 mi) at 4 knots (7.4 km/h; 4.6 mph) submerged
- Test depth: 80 m (260 ft)
- Complement: 44 (4 officers + 40 non-officers and sailors)
- Armament: 1 × 100 mm (4 in) / 47 caliber deck gun; 2 x 1 – 13.2 mm (0.52 in) anti-aircraft guns; 6 × 533 mm (21 in) torpedo tubes (4 forward, 2 aft); 12 × torpedoes

Italian submarine Lafolè was an Adua-class submarine built for the Royal Italian Navy (Regia Marina) during the 1930s. It was named after a "massacre at Lafolè", an ambush set up by Somalis on November 25, 1896, against a travelling Italian party near a village of Lafolè.

== Design and description ==
The Adua-class submarines were essentially repeats of the preceding Perla class. They displaced 680 long tons (690 t) surfaced and 844 long tons (858 t) submerged. The submarines were 60.18 meters (197 ft 5 in) long, had a beam of 6.45 meters (21 ft 2 in) and a draft of 4.7 meters (15 ft 5 in).

For surface running, the boats were powered by two 600-brake-horsepower (447 kW) diesel engines, each driving one propeller shaft. When submerged each propeller was driven by a 400-horsepower (298 kW) electric motor. They could reach 14 knots (26 km/h; 16 mph) on the surface and 7.5 knots (13.9 km/h; 8.6 mph) underwater. On the surface, the Adua class had a range of 3,180 nautical miles (5,890 km; 3,660 mi) at 10.5 knots (19.4 km/h; 12.1 mph), submerged, they had a range of 74 nmi (137 km; 85 mi) at 4 knots (7.4 km/h; 4.6 mph).

The boats were armed with six internal 53.3 cm (21.0 in) torpedo tubes, four in the bow and two in the stern. One reload torpedo was carried for each tube, for a total of twelve. They were also armed with one 100 mm (4 in) deck gun for combat on the surface. The light anti-aircraft armament consisted of one or two pairs of 13.2 mm (0.52 in) machine guns.

== Construction and career ==
Upon entering the service, in December of 1938 she was assigned to Leros as part of the V Submarine Group. Later re-assigned to Tobruk as part of the 62 Squadron (VI Submarine group) under command of Piero Riccomini.

After the declaration of war on June 10, 1940, Lafolè along with other submarines from the 62 Squadron was posted to Sollum to protect the harbors of Cyrenaica from a possible British attack. Later on she was sent off to Tobruk on an offensive mission. On June 20, 1940, she returned to the base without any sightings.

On July 3, 1940, Lafolè along with other submarines patrolled along the Gaudo–Derna line. On July 7–8, 1940, she detected ongoing large anti-submarine activity, but could not locate the enemy units. On July 14, 1940, she returned to the base, again without sighting any enemy units.

During September of 1940, she was involved in defensive missions in the Gulf of Taranto.

On October 8, 1940, Lafolè left Taranto for her new area of operation east of Gibraltar along the coast of Morocco. On October 15, 1940, she arrived in her designated patrol area, southeast of the island of Alboran and north of Cape Three Forks, close to Melilla.

On October 20, 1940, at approximately 11:00 Lafolè sighted 2 British destroyers, HMS Gallant and HMS Griffin, 12 miles north of Cape Three Forks. Enemy ships were moving slowly, conducting what looked like a submarine search, and apparently unaware of Lafolè's presence. Captain Riccomini closed in to within 500 meters and fired one aft torpedo at the target. Captain Riccomini, of course, couldn't possibly know that the British were fully aware of his submarine's presence. Two days earlier, Adua-class submarine Durbo was sunk not far from Lafolè's location. Among the documents captured from Durbo were coordinates of Lafolè. The British immediately sent out a search group composed of six destroyers (HMS Gallant, HMS Griffin, HMS Forester, HMS Hotspur and 2 others) to hunt for the submarine. While Lafolè was closing in on two "unsuspecting" British destroyers, a third one, HMS Hotspur, was rapidly approaching the submarine from her back, and thus closing the trap on unsuspecting boat. Once captain Riccomini fired his torpedoes, all three ships immediately counterattacked with depth charges. The first barrage damaged electric motors and pumps, bent the propeller shafts and caused flooding. Lafolè could no longer maintain the depth, and started continuously surfacing and submerging, yet the crew managed to keep her down for the next seven hours. At 18:30 Lafolè has surfaced one last time, and HMS Hotspur going full force rammed the submarine. The collision was so violent, that it threw out several men out of submarine. Second in command Giuseppe Accardi, and 8 more men were the only survivors, captain Riccomini, 3 officers and 35 other men all went down with the submarine. Lafolè sank in the position 36°00′N 3°00′W.

HMS Hotspur also suffered serious damage in the collision, and had to go back to Gibraltar for repairs. It only returned to action on February 20, 1941.

Captain Riccomini was posthumously awarded Silver Medal of Military Valor for his bravery and leadership in combating superior enemy forces.
