= Aldo Fraccaroli =

Italian naval historian and photographer

- Born: 17 September 1919; Milan, Italy
- Died: 23 March 2010 (aged 90); Lugano, Switzerland
- Occupations: Naval historian and photographer
- Spouse: Carolina
- Writing career
- Genre: Naval History
- Notable works: Marina militare italiana 1946; Dalla piroga alla portaerei; Italian Warships of World War I; Italian Warships of World War II

Aldo Fraccaroli (17 September 1919 – 23 March 2010) was an Italian naval historian and photographer who specialized in 20th-century Italian naval history. He served in the Regia Marina (Royal Italian Navy) during World War II and briefly in the Marina Militare during the 1950s.

== Life ==
Born in Milan, Fraccaroli was the son of the author, journalist and screenwriter Arnaldo Fraccaroli, and Lisetta Camerino. He began contributing articles and reviews to the newspaper Corriere della Sera among other general interest publications and the French naval annual Flottes de combat in 1937. The following year his photographs from the 5 May 1938 naval parade in the Gulf of Naples that was observed by Adolf Hitler and Benito Mussolini were published by the naval annual Jane's Fighting Ships.

Fraccaroli joined the Regia Marina reserve component and was commissioned as a Paymaster Sub-Lieutenant after the start of World War II. After assignments in Venice and Greece, he was transferred to the Naval Ministry in Rome in 1942. He was in the city when the Italians signed the Armistice of Cassibile with the Allies on 8 September and was able to rescue all of his negatives that were in storage at the Navy's Photographic Service. Dismissed from service afterwards, he returned to Milan where he finished his degree in jurisprudence. He was recalled to service in April 1945, but was again released about a year later.

After the war, Fraccaroli began working with the Italian edition of Reader's Digest and publishing articles in the newspapers L'Italia and Il Popolo as well as magazines such as Epoca. He resumed contributing to Jane's Fighting Ships and he published a special supplement to the 1950/51 edition covering Regia Marina's wartime construction that was the first authoritative material on this subject to be published in English.

Fraccaroli published his first book in 1946, Marina militare italiana 1946, a photographic volume on the Italian warships in service that year and followed it up with a general naval history in 1950, Italian: Dalla piroga alla portaerei, lit. 'From Pirogue to Aircraft Carrier'. Later that decade he began contributing to the nautical journals Vie del Mare and Italia sul Mare as well as the official Italian naval review, Rivista Marittima. He worked for the Touring Club Italiano and published a photography manual during this period. Fraccaroli was also a contributor to the Treccani Encyclopedia, covering nautical words and terms.

In the late 1960s, he published Italian Warships of World War I and Italian Warships of World War II with Ian Allan Publishing because no Italian publisher was interested in the subject and Ian Allan was publishing a series on all the navies involved in the world wars. Fraccaroli wrote the Italian sections of the 1860–1905 and 1905–1921 volumes of Conway's All the World's Fighting Ships during the 1970s and 1980s and began contributing articles to both Warship and Warship International. He also wrote articles for the Italian military history journal, Storia Militare.

After moving to Switzerland, he began writing for the local newspaper Azione, with a column entitled La buona lingua (Speaking Well). A book of his naval photographs was published in 1996, Aldo Fraccaroli — fotografo navale, and he was named the honorary president of the Italian Association of Naval and Maritime Documentation during the 1990s.

== Personal life ==
At the time of his death, Fraccaroli was 90 years old and he lived in Lugano.

== Bibliography ==
- Obituary (2010). "Aldo Fraccaroli (1919–2010)". Warship International. XLII (3): 191–193. ISSN 0043-0374.
