= Aldo Cocchia =

Italian admiral

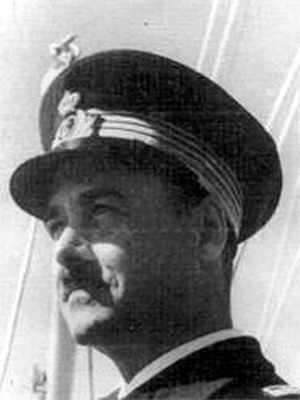
- Born: 30 August 1900; Naples, Campania, Italy
- Died: 12 December 1968 (aged 68); Naples, Campania, Italy
- Military career
- Allegiance: Kingdom of Italy
- Branch: Regia Marina; Italian Navy
- Service years: 1916–1963
- Commands: Luigi Torelli (submarine); Leros Naval Base; Nicoloso da Recco (destroyer); 16th Destroyer Squadron
- Conflicts: World War I; Second Italo-Ethiopian War; Spanish Civil War; World War II; Battle of the Atlantic; Battle of the Mediterranean; Battle of Crete; Battle of Skerki Bank
- Awards: Gold Medal of Military Valor; Silver Medal of Military Valor; Bronze Medal of Military Valor (three times)

Aldo Cocchia (30 August 1900 – 12 December 1968) was an Italian naval officer during World War II.

== Biography ==
Cocchia was born in Naples in 1900 and attended the Italian Naval Academy in Livorno, graduating in 1916 with the rank of ensign. During World War I he served on board the battleship Conte di Cavour. In the 1930s he participated in the Second Italo-Ethiopian War and the Spanish Civil War, commanding MAS, submarines and torpedo boats.

When Italy entered World War II Cocchia, with the rank of commander, was the commanding officer of the submarine Luigi Torelli; he commanded the boat during its first mission in the Atlantic Ocean, after which he was assigned to BETASOM base in Bordeaux as Chief of Staff.

After his promotion to captain, he was repatriated, and in May 1941 he led the motley flotilla that carried and landed near Sitia (on the eastern coast of Crete), during the German invasion of the island, an Italian regiment sent as reinforcement to the German troops engaged in the battle. He was then appointed military commander of the island of Leros, a role he held until April 1942, when he was replaced by Captain Luigi Mascherpa.

In April 1942 he was given command of the destroyer Nicoloso da Recco and the 16th Destroyer Squadron. In the subsequent months, he was the escort leader in numerous convoys carrying supplies from Italy and Greece towards North Africa, facing many attacks by British aircraft and submarines, with changing fortunes.

His last escort mission resulted, on 2 December 1942, in the Battle of Skerki Bank. His convoy (composed of the transport ships Aventino, Aspromonte, Puccini and KT 1), escorted by three destroyers (Da Recco, Folgore and Camicia Nera) and two torpedo boats (Procione and Clio), was attacked during the night by the British Force Q, consisting of the light cruisers Aurora, Sirius and Argonaut and the destroyers Quiberon and Quentin. On Cocchia's orders, the entire escort launched a determined counterattack, but could not prevent the destruction of the convoy. Da Recco, after two unsuccessful attacks with guns and torpedoes, closed in on Force Q to launch a third attack, but the accidental ignition of fuel oil contained in the forward funnel originated a column of sparks, that gave away the position of the ship. Accurate British fire immediately crippled Da Recco, igniting her forward magazines; more than half of the crew was killed or wounded, including Cocchia, who suffered severe burns, especially on his face. Temporarily blinded, he had to give up the command to his executive officer; he was initially hospitalized at the hospital in Torrebianca (Trapani) and had to spend the next three years in a number of clinics, undergoing numerous surgery operations in an attempt to mitigate the damage caused by the fire. He was permanently disfigured; for his determined defense of the convoy against superior forces he was awarded Gold Medal of Military Valor.

Due to his wounds, after the war he was transferred to the Role of Honour, where he reached the rank of admiral; from November 1958, he was director of the "Rivista Marittima" (the monthly magazine of the Italian Navy), and from July 1960 to June 1963 he was the head of the Italian Navy Historical Branch, directing the drafting of several volumes of its series on the activity of the Italian Navy in World War II. In his private life, he also authored several books about the war.

He died in Naples on 12 December 1968.

== Bibliography ==
- Aldo Cocchia, Convogli. Un marinaio in guerra 1940-1942, Mursia
