= Italian submarine Ascianghi =

Adua-class submarine of the Royal Italian Navy

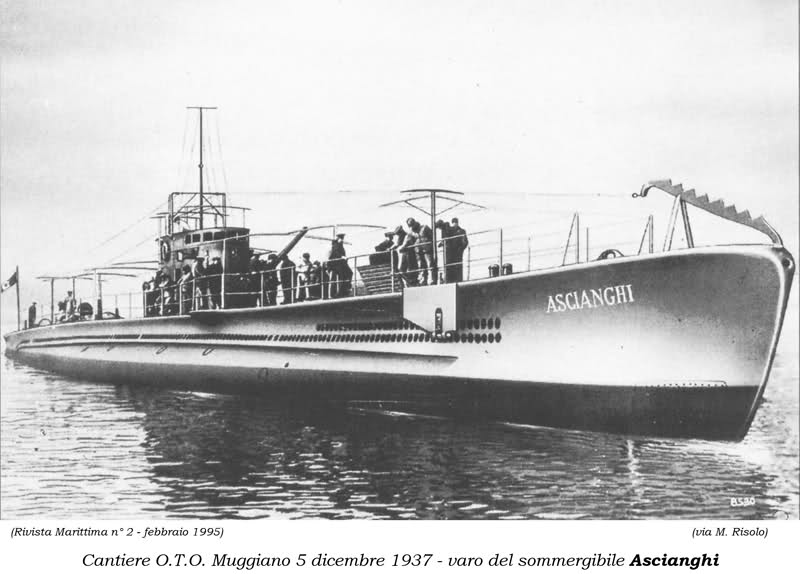
- RIN Ascianghi

History

Kingdom of Italy
- Name: Ascianghi
- Namesake: Lake Ashenge
- Builder: OTO
- Laid down: 20 January 1937
- Launched: 05 December 1937
- Commissioned: 25 March 1938
- Fate: Sunk, 23 July 1943

General characteristics
- Class & type: 600-Serie Adua-class submarine
- Displacement: 680 long tons (691 t) surfaced; 844 long tons (858 t) submerged
- Length: 60.18 m (197 ft 5 in)
- Beam: 6.45 m (21 ft 2 in)
- Draft: 4.7 m (15 ft 5 in)
- Installed power: 1,200 bhp (890 kW) (diesels); 800 hp (600 kW) (electric motors)
- Propulsion: Diesel-electric; 2 × FIAT diesel engines; 2 × Marelli electric motors
- Speed: 14 knots (26 km/h; 16 mph) surfaced; 7.5 knots (13.9 km/h; 8.6 mph) submerged
- Range: 3,180 nmi (5,890 km; 3,660 mi) at 10.5 knots (19.4 km/h; 12.1 mph) surfaced; 74 nmi (137 km; 85 mi) at 4 knots (7.4 km/h; 4.6 mph) submerged
- Test depth: 80 m (260 ft)
- Complement: 44 (4 officers + 40 non-officers and sailors)
- Armament: 6 × 533 mm (21 in) torpedo tubes (4 bow, 2 stern); 1 × 100 mm (4 in) / 47 caliber deck gun; 2 × 1 – 13.2 mm (0.52 in) anti-aircraft guns

Italian submarine Ascianghi was an Adua-class submarine built for the Royal Italian Navy (Regia Marina) during the 1930s. It was named after Lake Ashenge in Ethiopia.

== Design and description ==
The Adua-class submarines were essentially repeats of the preceding Perla class. They displaced 680 long tons (690 t) surfaced and 844 long tons (858 t) submerged. The submarines were 60.18 meters (197 ft 5 in) long, had a beam of 6.45 meters (21 ft 2 in) and a draft of 4.7 meters (15 ft 5 in).

For surface running, the boats were powered by two 600-brake-horsepower (447 kW) diesel engines, each driving one propeller shaft. When submerged each propeller was driven by a 400-horsepower (298 kW) electric motor. They could reach 14 knots (26 km/h; 16 mph) on the surface and 7.5 knots (13.9 km/h; 8.6 mph) underwater. On the surface, the Adua class had a range of 3,180 nautical miles (5,890 km; 3,660 mi) at 10.5 knots (19.4 km/h; 12.1 mph), submerged, they had a range of 74 nmi (137 km; 85 mi) at 4 knots (7.4 km/h; 4.6 mph).

The boats were armed with six internal 53.3 cm (21.0 in) torpedo tubes, four in the bow and two in the stern. They were also armed with one 100 mm (4 in) deck gun for combat on the surface. The light anti-aircraft armament consisted of one or two pairs of 13.2 mm (0.52 in) machine guns.

== Construction and career ==
Ascianghi was launched on 5 December 1937 at OTO's shipyard in La Spezia and commissioned on 25 March 1938. After a brief training she was assigned to Leros.

In 1940 Ascianghi, under command of captain Ugo Gelli, was assigned to 15th Squadron (I Submarine Group) based at La Spezia, however, Ascianghi was actually based out of Cagliari.

On 20 June 1940 she left the base for her first war mission around the Balearic Islands, between Cape San Antonio and Formentera. At 1:25 on 22 June Ascianghi sighted a large armed merchant, of about 15,000 tons, and attacked her with four torpedoes, but they all missed due to stormy weather and rough seas. The submarine then attacked the merchant with her deck gun, striking the ship several times, but the merchant fired back with great accuracy, forcing Ascianghi to disengage and turn away. Neither British or French documents show any evidence that any of their ships were attacked at this time, and at this place. The submarine returned to base on 28 June.

Towards the end of January 1941, as British Forces left Gibraltar to bombard Genoa, Ascianghi was deployed as a defensive screen about twenty miles southwest of Cape Mele, however, due to bad weather, the British Naval forces returned to the port and aborted their mission.

During 24–29 March 1941 Ascianghi was sent along with two other submarines to patrol between Alexandria and Cape Krio. Their task was to form a barrier and screen the battle group of Regia Marina during Operation "Gaudo". The submarines failed to detect the British Fleet which led to the disaster at Cape Matapan. As a result, new commander was appointed, captain Olinto Di Serio.

On 20 September 1941 Ascianghi was sent to patrol off Beirut and Tripoli in Syria. The next day at 21:46 she intercepted an old steamer Antar (389 GRT, 1890), sailing under the flag of British Palestine, in the position 33°57′N 35°04′E, 8 nautical miles northwest of Beirut, during a Port Said-Mersin trip with a cargo of cotton, tea and tinplate. Ascianghi ordered the crew to abandon ship, and then used three torpedoes and a deck gun to sink her.

Towards mid-June 1942, along with four other submarines, including Aradam and Dessiè she patrolled between Malta, Pantelleria and Lampedusa with the task of engaging British convoy "Harpoon". None of the submarines were able to sight enemy ships.

In July 1942, Rodolfo Bombig was appointed as submarine's commander.

On 11 August 1942 Ascianghi was among eleven submarines deployed of the coast of northern Tunisia, between Scoglio Due Fratelli and Skerki Banks, to attack a British convoy for Malta during British Operation Pedestal. Ascianghi played no active role in this operation.

Shortly after, Rino Erler was appointed a new commander of the submarine.

At the beginning of November 1942 Ascianghi transported 18 tons of ammunition, from Messina to Tobruk. Also, on 3 November 1942, she carried about twenty German soldiers who survived an air crash and picked them up in the Mediterranean and brought them to Libya.

Between 11 and 16 November Ascianghi patrolled off Algerian coast. On 15 November, in the Bay of Bougie, she sighted a small group of British ships leaving the harbor, mistakenly identifying them as a cruiser escorted by two destroyers. At 2:30 while surfaced, Ascianghi launched two torpedoes against a middle ship but missed her. At 3:46 she launched two more torpedoes against the last ship in the convoy, and both hit the target. Minesweeper HMS Algerine sank five miles north of Cape Carbon, with the deaths of 24 of her 56 crew. Ascianghi was not detected by the other two ships and remained in the area until 16 November. She returned to Naples two days later.

On the night of 2 March 1943, while on mission in the Gulf of Sirte, Ascianghi sighted a convoy with several escorts and launched three torpedoes against a destroyer from 800 meters. After being spotted by escorts she had to dive and move away to avoid being attacked. Two explosions were heard, but there were no reports of any ships being sunk or damaged.

After that Ascianghi remained at the base for repairs and maintenance work, captain Erler was replaced by a young officer Mario Fiorini.

On 16 July 1943 the submarine left Naples heading to an area southeast of Sicily, to attack the supply lines for Allied troops that landed on the island.

In the afternoon of 23 July 1943 while patrolling submerged ten miles from Augusta Ascianghi detected a group of enemy cruisers and destroyers. She closed in and launched two torpedoes, one of which at 13:38 struck light cruiser HMS Newfoundland blowing off the rudder and causing casualties, putting the cruiser out of service until 1944. At 15:41 one of the escorts, destroyer HMS Laforey after dodging another torpedo, immediately went after Ascianghi with HMS Eclipse joining in. Ascianghi went through several depth charge attacks, and eventually got seriously damaged and flooded. Ascianghi plummeted below the test depth, and to avoid being destroyed by pressure, she was forced to surface and try fighting it out with her deck gun. But she was immediately fired upon and hit by both ships, causing serious casualties. Abandoned by the survivors, Ascianghi sank at 16:23, with 23 people killed, and 27 survivors.

Ships sunk by Ascianghi
Date	Ship	Flag	Tonnage	Ship Type	Cargo
21 September 1941	Antar	(Mandatory Palestine)	389 GRT	cargo	general cargo
15 November 1942	Algerine	(United Kingdom)	850 GRT	minesweeper	N/A
Total:			1,239 GRT		
