= Italian submarine Dessiè =

Italian submarine

Coordinates: 37°48′N 2°14′E

History

Kingdom of Italy
- Namesake: Dessie
- Builder: Tosi, Taranto
- Laid down: 20 April 1936
- Launched: 22 November 1936
- Commissioned: 14 April 1937
- Fate: Sunk, 28 November 1942

General characteristics
- Class & type: 600-Serie Adua-class submarine
- Displacement: 680 long tons (691 t) surfaced; 844 long tons (858 t) submerged
- Length: 60.28 m (197 ft 9 in)
- Beam: 6.45 m (21 ft 2 in)
- Draught: 4.64 m (15 ft 3 in)
- Installed power: 1,400 hp (1,000 kW) (diesels); 800 hp (600 kW) (electric motors)
- Propulsion: Diesel-electric; 2 × Tosi diesel engines; 2 × Marelli electric motors
- Speed: 14 knots (26 km/h; 16 mph) surfaced; 7.5 knots (13.9 km/h; 8.6 mph) submerged
- Range: 3,180 nmi (5,890 km; 3,660 mi) at 10.5 kn (19.4 km/h; 12.1 mph) surfaced; 74 nmi (137 km; 85 mi) at 4 kn (7.4 km/h; 4.6 mph) submerged.
- Test depth: 80 m (260 ft)
- Complement: 44 (4 officers + 40 non-officers and sailors)
- Armament: 1 × 100 mm (4 in) / 47 caliber deck gun; 2 x 1 – 13.2 mm (0.52 in) anti-aircraft guns; 6 × 533 mm (21 in) torpedo tubes (4 forward, 2 aft); 12 × torpedoes

Italian submarine Dessiè was an Adua-class submarine built for the Royal Italian Navy (Regia Marina) during the 1930s. It was named after the town of Dessie in north-central Ethiopia.

== Design and description ==
The Adua-class submarines were essentially repeats of the preceding Perla class. They displaced 680 long tons (690 t) surfaced and 844 long tons (858 t) submerged. The submarines were 60.18 meters (197 ft 5 in) long, had a beam of 6.45 meters (21 ft 2 in) and a draft of 4.7 meters (15 ft 5 in).

For surface running, the boats were powered by two 600-brake-horsepower (447 kW) diesel engines, each driving one propeller shaft. When submerged each propeller was driven by a 400-horsepower (298 kW) electric motor. They could reach 14 knots (26 km/h; 16 mph) on the surface and 7.5 knots (13.9 km/h; 8.6 mph) underwater. On the surface, the Adua class had a range of 3,180 nautical miles (5,890 km; 3,660 mi) at 10.5 knots (19.4 km/h; 12.1 mph), submerged, they had a range of 74 nmi (137 km; 85 mi) at 4 knots (7.4 km/h; 4.6 mph).

The boats were armed with six internal 53.3 cm (21.0 in) torpedo tubes, four in the bow and two in the stern. One reload torpedo was carried for each tube, for a total of twelve. They were also armed with one 100 mm (4 in) deck gun for combat on the surface. The light anti-aircraft armament consisted of one or two pairs of 13.2 mm (0.52 in) machine guns.

== Construction and career ==
Dessiè was built at the Tosi shipyard in Taranto. She was laid down on 20 April 1936, launched on 22 November of the same year, and commissioned on 14 April 1937. Upon commission, she was assigned to 43rd Submarine Squadron in Taranto. During August and September of 1937 she performed several missions during the Spanish Civil War but without any success. In 1938 she was reassigned to Tobruk, and in 1940 she returned to Italy, and was assigned to 46th Squadron (IV Submarine Group) based first at Taranto and then at Augusta.

At the beginning of the World War II, from 8 to 16 August 1940, Dessiè, under command of Captain Fausto Sestini, patrolled the waters between Gaudo and Cerigotto, just off the coast of Crete. In the evening of August 13 she sighted a fast transport moving east. An attack was attempted but was unsuccessful because of the speed of the target.

Between late October and early November, Dessiè was part of a group of four submarines sent to patrol an area between the Ionian Sea and the Aegean Sea, but no sightings were made, even though the British fleet was in that area at the time.

At the end of the month, she was again deployed, now under command of Captain Adriano Pini, this time off Malta, with the task of intercepting the ships of British Operation Collar. At 3:05 on 28 November, she sighted a naval column consisting of three capital ships. Dessiè launched two stern torpedoes from 3,500 meters against a middle target, and disengaged by diving. An explosion was heard, but British official documents mention no attack by Dessié or any damage inflicted. The Royal Navy's 3rd Cruise Division, consisting of the heavy cruiser HMS York and light cruisers HMS Glasgow and HMS Gloucester was indeed passing through the area at the time of the attack.

Between 16–25 December 1940, Dessiè together with submarines Serpente and Fratelli Bandiera patrolled around Malta. In January 1941, she was deployed off Derna. Both patrols were uneventful.

On 20 May 1941, Dessiè together with numerous other submarines was deployed to an area between Crete, Alexandria and Sollum to support the German invasion of Crete (Operation Merkur).

On 21 and 22 July 1941, Dessiè along with three other submarines was deployed to area between Pantelleria and Malta. Her task was to intercept a British convoy, part of Operation Substance, but she did not sight any enemy ships.

On 3 January 1942, Dessiè was sent to patrol an area south off Malta with the task of detecting and attacking any British naval forces that might attempt to intercept Italian convoy "M 43", bringing supplies to Libya. No ships were detected.

In mid-June 1942, she was sent along with four other submarines, including Aradam and Ascianghi to patrol between Malta, Pantelleria and Lampedusa, with the task of intercepting a British convoy, part of Operation Harpoon. However, the submarine did not sight any enemy ships.

On 11 August 1942, Dessiè, now under command of Captain Renato Scandola, was among eleven submarines deployed off the coast Tunisia between Scoglio Due Fratelli and Skerki Banks. Her task was to intercept a British convoy for Malta, part of Operation Pedestal. Around 19:00 on 12 August, Dessiè sighted the convoy, counting 14 merchants and ten destroyers. At 19:10, she closed in to within 1,800 metres (5,900 ft) and at 19:38 she launched four torpedoes. After one minute and forty seconds, a loud explosion was heard, as SS Brisbane Star (12,791 GRT) was hit. However, the steamship succeeded in restarting her engines and reaching Malta on 14 August after a short stop in Soussa, even though she was further damaged by German torpedo bombers. At 19:56, Dessiè, while preparing to launch her stern torpedoes, was attacked by enemy destroyers, who continued their attacks until 21:27 without causing any damage to the submarine. Dessiè surfaced at 22:12 and continued her patrol. In the evening of 13 August, she was bombed by an aircraft, that killed one crew member and wounded several others and caused damage to her batteries, which forced her to return to base.

On 2 November 1942, Dessiè left Messina at 21:15 carrying 20 tons of ammunition to Tobruk. She arrived in Tobruk around 5 or 6 November, unloaded her cargo and departed at 16:10 to return to Messina, arriving on 11 November.

On 18 November, Dessiè sailed from Messina, under command of Captain Alberto Gorini, to patrol an area off the coast of Bona, Algeria, and to attack enemy traffic around the ports of Philippeville and Bougie. At 19:12 on 27 November, Captain Gorini communicated with his base for the last time. Only after the end of World War II was it was learned that Dessiè had been detected on the surface by airplanes at 14:05 on 28 November, about 10 miles (16 km) off Bona. A pilot radioed in her coordinates, and destroyers HMAS Quiberon and HMS Quentin were sent to search for the submarine. Detected and hit hard by depth charges, Dessiè had to surface with a noticeable stern list; she went down and finally sank stern first with all hands.
