= HMS Argonaut (61) =

Cruiser of the Royal Navy

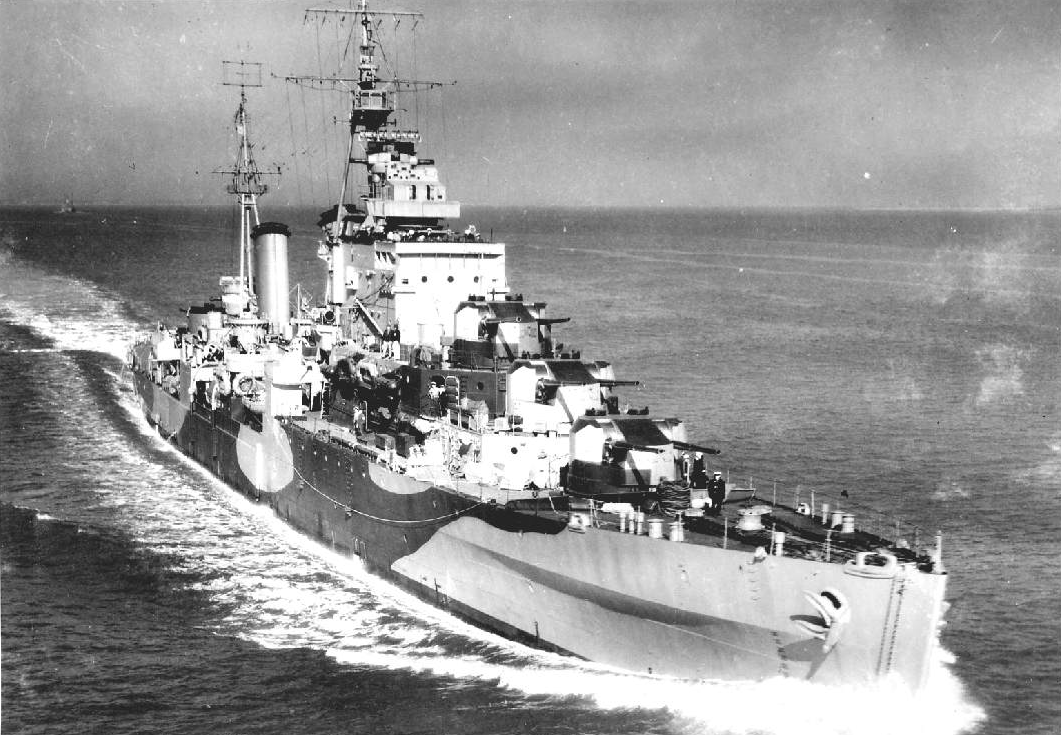
- Argonaut in her war (dazzle) colours, November 1943 just after repairs at the Philadelphia Navy Yard

History

United Kingdom
- Name: Argonaut
- Builder: Cammell Laird Shipyard (Birkenhead, UK)
- Laid down: 21 November 1939
- Launched: 6 September 1941
- Commissioned: 8 August 1942
- Out of service: 6 July 1946
- Reclassified: In reserve from 1946 to 1955
- Identification: Pennant number: 61
- Fate: Scrapped, 19 November 1955

General characteristics (as built)
- Class & type: Dido-class light cruiser
- Displacement: 5,600 tons standard; 6,850 tons full load
- Length: 485 ft (148 m) pp; 512 ft (156 m) oa
- Beam: 50.5 ft (15.4 m)
- Draught: 14 ft (4.3 m)
- Propulsion: Parsons geared turbines; Four shafts; Four Admiralty 3-drum boilers; 62,000 shp (46 MW)
- Speed: 32.25 knots (59.73 km/h; 37.11 mph)
- Range: 2,414 km (1,303 nmi; 1,500 mi) (1,500 miles) at 30 knots; 6,824 km (4,240 miles) at 16 knots
- Complement: 480
- Armament: 10 (5×2) 5.25 in (133 mm) dual purpose guns; 4 × 20 mm (0.8 in) single guns; 8 (2×4) 2 pdr (40 mm) pom-poms quad guns; 2 × 21-inch (533 mm) triple Torpedo Tubes
- Armour: Belt: 3 in (76 mm); Deck: 1 in (25 mm); Magazines: 2 in (51 mm); Bulkheads: 1 in (25 mm)

HMS Argonaut was a Dido-class cruiser of the British Royal Navy which saw active service during the Second World War. Constructed at the Cammell Laird shipyard, Birkenhead, Argonaut was laid down in 1939, launched in September 1941, and formally commissioned into service on 8 August 1942.

She saw service in the Mediterranean in 1942, and was badly damaged on 14 December. After being repaired she took part in Operation Overlord, the Normandy Landings, and Operation Dragoon, the invasion of Southern France, before serving as an escort carrier group flagship.

After the war she was laid up and scrapped in 1955.

== History ==
=== Mediterranean service ===
During October and November 1942, Argonaut served as part of Operation Torch, the Allied landings in North Africa. The cruiser formed part of Force H, based in Gibraltar and commanded by Vice Admiral Sir E.N. Syfret. It was charged with guarding the landings against possible attack from Italian or Vichy French naval forces. HMS Argonaut, in particular, was dispatched on a diversionary mission into the Mediterranean.

In December 1942 Argonaut joined the newly formed Force Q, commanded by Rear Admiral Cecil Harcourt, with the mission of disrupting German–Italian convoys on the Tunisian coast. In addition to Argonaut, Force Q included the cruisers Aurora and Sirius, and the destroyers Quentin and HMAS Quiberon.

On 1 December, Argonaut and the other ships in Force Q took part in the Battle of Skerki Bank – attacking and largely destroying an Italian convoy. While the Axis forces lost four troop ships and the destroyer Folgore the Allies emerged from the engagement intact. On the following day, the German Air Force sank HMS Quentin westward of Cap Serrat.

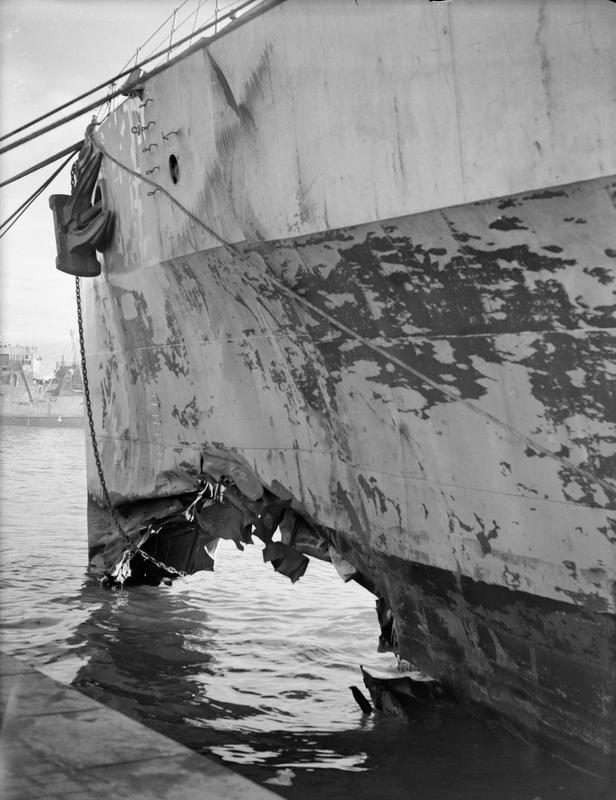
Argonaut's hull, after suffering heavy torpedo damage.

=== Damaged ===
On 14 December 1942, Argonaut was heavily damaged when the Italian submarine Lazzaro Mocenigo struck the cruiser with two torpedoes from a spread of four, causing serious damage. The bow and stern sections of the cruiser were effectively blown off and the steering wrecked. Though only three crew members were killed, the damage was so severe that German authorities mistakenly believed the Argonaut had been sunk. The ship was patched up and limped to Algiers for more temporary repairs. It then sailed for the United States, where it underwent a seven-month reconstruction, completed in November 1943.

=== Repairs and later service ===
When the Argonaut returned to the UK, it was refitted and received the new Type 293 and 277 radars. It took part in bombardment duties on D-Day under the command of Captain Longley. It also supported the Allied invasion of Southern France, Operation Dragoon, before seeing duty as an escort carrier flagship.

Subsequently, the ship conducted a sweep of the Aegean Sea, sinking a number of small Axis craft, before sailing east to the Indian Ocean, where Argonaut joined the British Pacific Fleet in 1945. After the war, she was laid up on return to the UK in 1946 and saw no further service before being scrapped in 1955.

== Bibliography ==
- Campbell, N.J.M. (1980). "Great Britain". In Chesneau, Roger (ed.). Conway's All the World's Fighting Ships 1922–1946. New York: Mayflower Books. pp. 2–85. ISBN 0-8317-0303-2.
- Colledge, J. J.; Warlow, Ben (2006) [1969]. Ships of the Royal Navy: The Complete Record of All Fighting Ships of the Royal Navy from the 15th Century to the Present (3rd Rev ed.). London: Chatham Publishing. ISBN 978-1-86176-281-8. OCLC 67375475.
- Friedman, Norman (2010). British Cruisers: Two World Wars and After. Barnsley, UK: Seaforth Publishing. ISBN 978-1-59114-078-8.
- Raven, Alan & Roberts, John (1980). British Cruisers of World War Two. Annapolis, Maryland: Naval Institute Press. ISBN 0-87021-922-7.
- Rohwer, Jürgen (2005). Chronology of the War at Sea 1939–1945: The Naval History of World War Two (Third Revised ed.). Annapolis, Maryland: Naval Institute Press. ISBN 1-59114-119-2.
- Whitley, M. J. (1995). Cruisers of World War Two: An International Encyclopedia. London: Cassell. ISBN 1-86019-874-0.
