= HMS Sirius (82) =

Cruiser

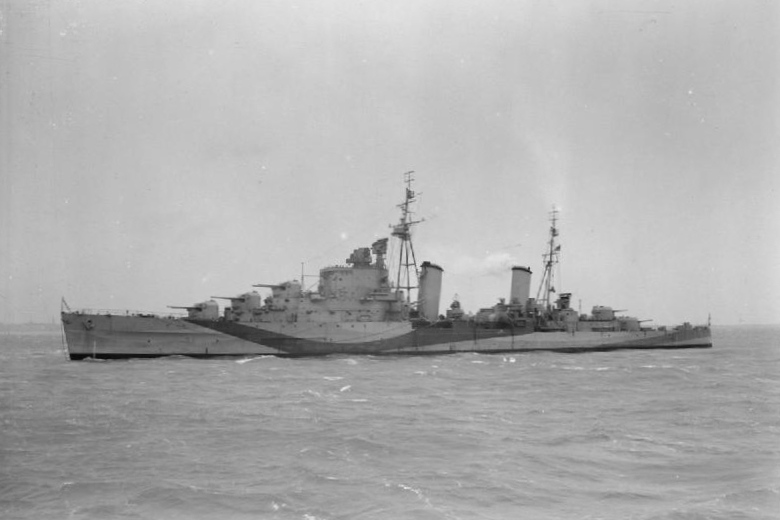
- Sirius leaving Portsmouth, 17 June 1942

History

United Kingdom
- Name: Sirius
- Builder: Portsmouth Dockyard (Portsmouth, UK): Scotts Shipbuilding and Engineering Company (Greenock, Scotland)
- Laid down: 6 April 1938
- Launched: 18 September 1940
- Commissioned: 6 May 1942
- Decommissioned: 1949
- Out of service: 14 March 1951
- Fate: Scrapped, 15 October 1956
- Notes: Pennant number: 82

General characteristics (as built)
- Class & type: Dido-class light cruiser
- Displacement: 5,600 tons standard; 6,850 tons full load
- Length: 485 ft (148 m) pp; 512 ft (156 m) oa
- Beam: 50.5 ft (15.4 m)
- Draught: 14 ft (4.3 m)
- Propulsion: 4 geared steam turbines; Four shafts; Four Admiralty 3-drum boilers; 62,000 shp (46 MW)
- Speed: 32.25 knots (59.73 km/h; 37.11 mph)
- Range: 2,414 km (1,500 miles) at 30 knots; 6,824 km (4,240 miles) at 16 knots
- Complement: 480
- Armament: 10 (5x2) QF 5.25-inch (133 mm) guns; 1 x 4.0 in (102 mm) gun, 8 (2x4) 0.5-inch (12.7 mm) machine guns; 12 (3x4) QF 2-pounder (40-mm) pom-poms; 6 (2x3) 21-inch (533 mm) torpedo tubes
- Armor: Belt: 3 inch, Deck: 1 inch, Magazines: 2 inch, Bulkheads: 1 inch.

HMS Sirius was a Dido-class light cruiser of the Royal Navy. She was built by Portsmouth Dockyard (Portsmouth, United Kingdom), with the keel being laid down on 6 April 1938. She was launched on 18 September 1940, and commissioned 6 May 1942.

== History ==
Sirius's completion was delayed due to German bombing at Portsmouth Dockyard so she was completed at Scotts Shipbuilding and Engineering Company (Greenock, Scotland). On completion she initially joined the Home Fleet, and was then assigned to operate in the Mediterranean in August for Operation Pedestal, the supply of Malta. She was then ordered to the South Atlantic to patrol against Axis blockade runners on the Far East route, returning to Gibraltar in November for Operation Torch, the North African landings. As part of Force Q at Bone in December she harried Axis convoys to and from Tunisia until the Axis surrender in North Africa.

Force Q, including Sirius, took part in the last naval battle held in the Mediterranean Sea during 1942. It consisted of cruisers Sirius, Aurora, Argonaut and destroyers Quentin and Quiberon, which intercepted a small Axis convoy in the Sicilian Channel destined for Tunisia, starting the Battle of Skerki Bank. The Axis convoy consisted of the German troopship KT-1 (850 GRT) and Italian troopships Aventino (3,794 GRT), Puccini (2,422 GRT) and Aspromonte (a militarized ferry-boat, 976 GRT) and an escort force composed of three destroyers and two torpedo boats. Force Q intercepted the convoy on the night of 1–2 December. The British ships attacked and sank all four troopships alongside one of the escorting destroyers, heavily damaging another and both torpedo boats. The destroyer Camicia Nera launched all of her six torpedoes from a range of only 2 kilometers, but missed the British ships. At dawn, the savage short-range engagement revealed a clear British victory: Axis losses amounted to 5 ships and over 2000 men, for the loss of HMS Quentin (G78) at dawn to Luftwaffe dive bombers.

Sirius then joined the 12th Cruiser Squadron and participated in the Allied invasion of Sicily, (Operation Husky), in July. For the next few months she supported the army ashore, and in September took part in the occupation of Taranto before transferring to the Adriatic, where, on 7 October 1943 Sirius, Penelope and the destroyers Faulknor and Fury, engaged the enemy north of Astipalea (Stampalia) in the Dodecanese, where they attacked a German convoy consisting of the auxiliary submarine chaser Uj 2111 (former Italian gunboat Tramaglio), the cargo ship Olympus and seven Marinefährprahm, sinking all but one MFP.

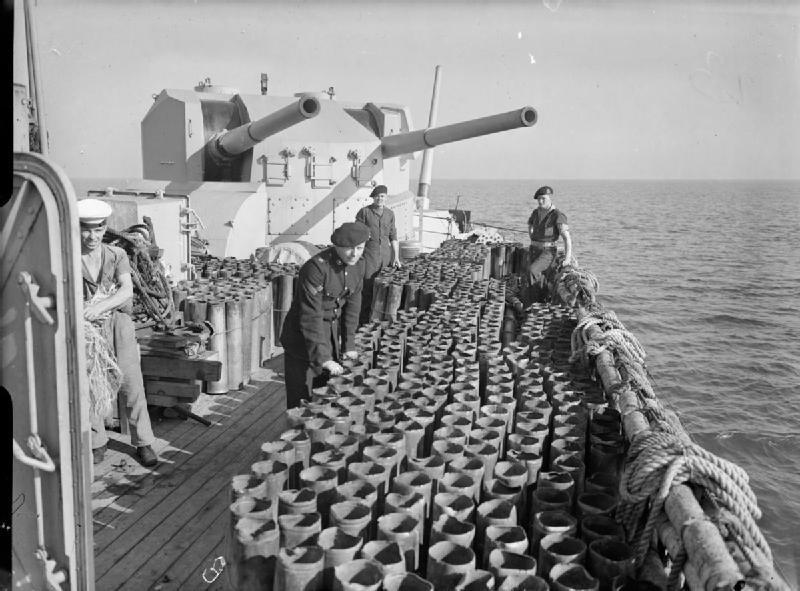
The Royal Navy's big guns support the Allied armies at Normandy on board HMS Sirius in the Sword area. The number of shells used by Royal Marines manning the twin 5.25 inch gun X turret can be gauged by the 2000 shell cases massed on X-gun deck.

After bombarding Kos Harbour with HMS Aurora (12) on 17 October, Sirius came under sustained air attack off the island of Karpathos. She was hit on the quarterdeck by a 250 kg bomb, starting fires aft and killing 14 sailors, forcing her to withdraw to Massawa for repairs. These were carried out between November 1943 and February 1944, when the ship returned to Britain for Operation Overlord, the Normandy landings, where she was part of the reserve of the Eastern Task Force. In August, she returned to Mediterranean waters for the landings in the south of France, Operation Dragoon. She then served again in the Aegean, where, in October 1944, she was present during the reoccupation of Athens. Sirius remained with the Mediterranean Fleet, 15th Cruiser Squadron, postwar until 1946. After a refit at Portsmouth in 1946, Sirius joined the 2nd Cruiser Squadron with the Home Fleet in March 1947.

She was paid off in 1949 and was put up for disposal in 1956. On 15 October 1956 Sirius arrived at the Blyth yard of Hughes Bolckow for breaking up.

== Bibliography ==
- Campbell, N.J.M. (1980). "Great Britain". In Chesneau, Roger (ed.). Conway's All the World's Fighting Ships 1922–1946. New York: Mayflower Books. pp. 2–85. ISBN 0-8317-0303-2.
- Colledge, J. J.; Warlow, Ben (2006) [1969]. Ships of the Royal Navy: The Complete Record of All Fighting Ships of the Royal Navy from the 15th Century to the Present (3rd Rev ed.). London: Chatham Publishing. ISBN 978-1-86176-281-8. OCLC 67375475.
- Friedman, Norman (2010). British Cruisers: Two World Wars and After. Barnsley, UK: Seaforth Publishing. ISBN 978-1-59114-078-8.
- Raven, Alan & Roberts, John (1980). British Cruisers of World War Two. Annapolis, Maryland: Naval Institute Press. ISBN 0-87021-922-7.
- Rohwer, Jürgen (2005). Chronology of the War at Sea 1939–1945: The Naval History of World War Two (Third Revised ed.). Annapolis, Maryland: Naval Institute Press. ISBN 1-59114-119-2.
- Whitley, M. J. (1995). Cruisers of World War Two: An International Encyclopedia. London: Cassell. ISBN 1-86019-874-0.
