= Battle of Skerki Bank =

1942 naval battle of World War II

- Part of the Battle of the Mediterranean
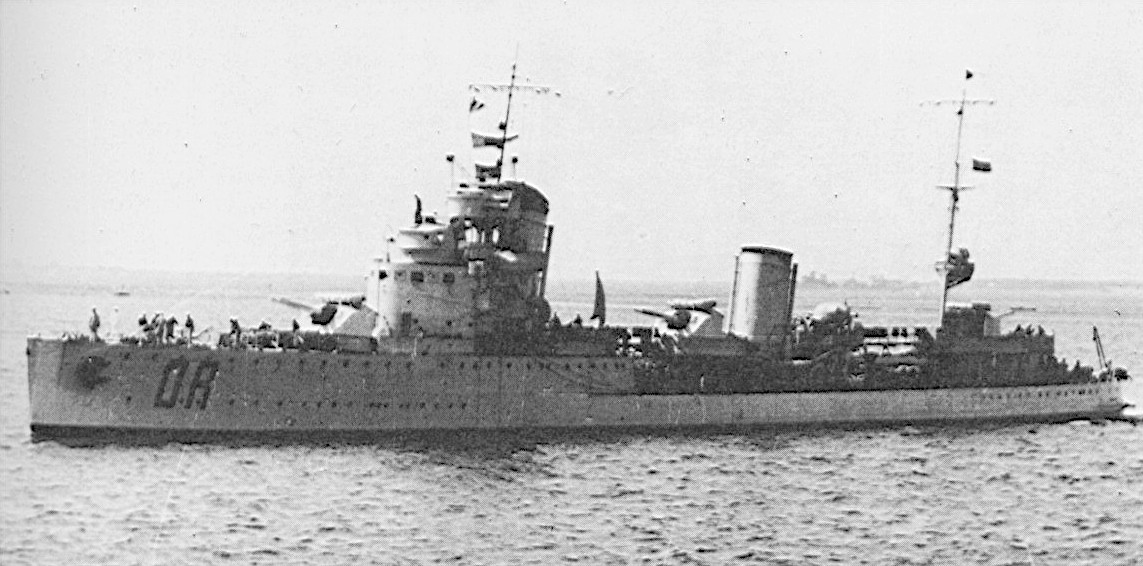
- Nicoloso da Recco
Date	2 December 1942
Location	Skerki Bank, Mediterranean Sea 37°45′12″N 10°57′12″E
Result	British victory

Belligerents
United Kingdom; Australia	Italy; Germany

Commanders and leaders
(United Kingdom) Cecil Harcourt	(Kingdom of Italy) Aldo Cocchia

Strength
3 light cruisers; 2 destroyers	3 destroyers; 2 torpedo boats; 2 troopships; 1 ferry; 1 motor raft

Casualties and losses
Splinter damage	c. 2,200 killed; 1 destroyer sunk; 1 destroyer damaged; 2 torpedo boats damaged; 2 troopships sunk; 1 ferry sunk; 1 motor raft sunk

The Battle of Skerki Bank (La distruzione del Convoglio "Aventino") was an engagement during the Second World War which took place near Skerki Bank in the Mediterranean Sea in the early hours of 2 December 1942. Force Q, a flotilla of Royal Navy cruisers and destroyers, attacked Convoy H, an Italian convoy and its Regia Marina escort of destroyers and torpedo boats.

Force Q sank the four Italian merchant ships and one of the escorting destroyers in exchange for minor splinter damage. Force Q was attacked by Luftwaffe torpedo bombers at 06:30 on 3 December, sinking the destroyer Quentin with one torpedo and damaging the destroyer Quiberon. The battle was the first and most significant success for Force Q.

== Background ==
=== Force Q ===
Soon after the beginning of Operation Torch, Allied commanders began to make arrangements to intensify the offensive against the Axis supply route from Italy to Tunis and Bizerta in Tunisia. On 30 November, once Allied fighter cover could give sufficient protection, Force Q (Rear Admiral Cecil Harcourt) was based at Bône, a port on the north-east Algerian coast, not far from the Tunisian border. Force Q consisted of the light cruisers HMS Aurora (flagship), Argonaut and Sirius with the destroyers HMS Quentin and HMAS Quiberon.

=== Convoy H ===
Convoy H comprised the German transport KT-1 (850 gross register tons [GRT]), Aventino (3,794 GRT), Puccini (2,422 GRT) and the converted ferry Aspromonte (976 GRT). The ships were carrying reinforcements to Africa, which included 1,766 troops, 698 long tons (709 t) of cargo (mainly ammunition), four tanks, 32 other vehicles and twelve artillery pieces. The escort was commanded by Captain Aldo Cocchia in the destroyer Nicoloso da Recco (flagship) with Camicia Nera and Folgore, together with the torpedo boats Clio and Procione.

== Prelude ==
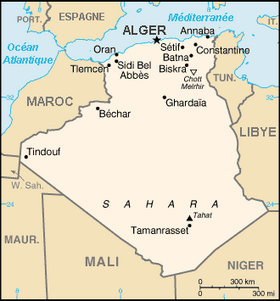
Map of Algeria showing Annaba (formerly Bône), the new base for Force Q

On 1 December, Force Q sailed to attack Axis shipping on the convoy route from Trapani in Sicily to Tunis. Four convoys were at sea, comprising thirteen merchantmen escorted by seven destroyers and twelve torpedo boats. Three convoys were ordered to return after being spotted by British reconnaissance aircraft but Convoy H continued towards Tunis. The convoy was overflown by aircraft during the night of 1/2 December and flares marked the course of the ships; at 00:30 Force Q picked up the Italian ships on radar, 60 nmi (110 km; 69 mi) north-east of Bizerta.

Cocchia sent Procione ahead to sweep for mines. Supermarina had emphasised the importance of the convoy keeping in close formation but realising that hostile ships were in the area, Cocchia ordered the convoy to make a 90° turn south south-east at 00:01. At 00:17 Cocchia ordered a turn to west south-west; the convoy should have doglegged 3 nmi (5.6 km; 3.5 mi) to the south, which was close as was prudent to unmarked minefields. The convoy lost formation because Puccini missed the turn order and rammed Aspromonte; KT 1, which had no wireless, failed to follow Puccini and strayed to the north-west.

== Battle ==
At 00:27, Force Q, sailing at 20 kn (23 mph; 37 km/h), reached the convoy. De Recco was on a west south-west course, ahead of Aventino, Clio and Aspromonte. Puccini and Folgore were side by side, 6,000 yd (3.0 nmi) behind De Recco, heading south south-west; Camicia Nera was 3,000 yd (1.5 nmi) to the north of Puccini and Procione was minesweeping 6,000 yd (3.0 nmi; 3.4 mi; 5.5 km) south of De Recco, all heading west south-west. Force Q approached with Aurora leading, followed by Sirius, Argonaut, Quiberon and Quentin; at 00:38, 1,800 yd (1,600 m) distant, the leading ships fired on KT 1 which exploded. Argonaut and Quiberon opened fire on Procione (or De Recco) as Cocchia ordered the escorts to attack. Force Q went around the hulk of KT 1 and Argonaut fired and launched a torpedo at KT 1, then at 00:39 Argonaut sailed to the north-east to what turned out to be a false contact. After a couple of minutes, Argonaut fired at Camicia Nera as it advanced to the attack, Aurora also firing at the destroyer, under the impression that it was a merchant ship. Camicia Nera turned and launched six torpedoes in two minutes from 00:43 at 2,200 yd (1.1 nmi) range then turned north, amidst shell splashes. Aspromonte was 900 yd (0.44 nmi) to the left of Aurora and Aventino 4,000 yd (2.0 nmi) away. Argonaut was also preparing to fire on Aventino as Sirius fired on Folgore and Clio.

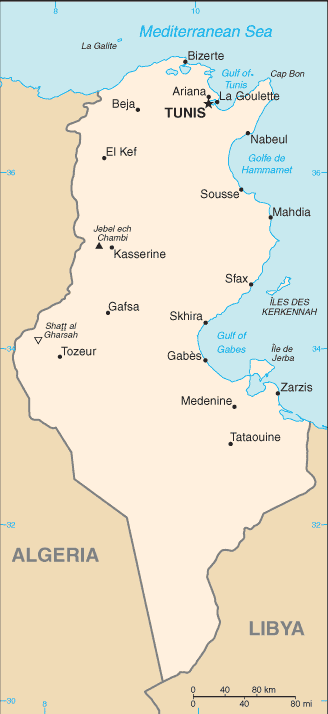
Map showing the Tunisian coast

Folgore had attacked before receiving Cocchia's order and at 00:47 fired three torpedoes to port at Aurora, at a range underestimated at 1,500 yd (0.74 nmi) and turned away. Sirius caught a freighter in one of its searchlights and at 00:50 Folgore turned tightly to port and fired its last three torpedoes at the searchlight; the torpedoes missed but two hits were claimed by mistake. Folgore made to the south-west at 27 kn (50 km/h; 31 mph) but at 00:52 it was hit by nine shells from Argonaut causing severe flooding and a large fire. Folgore listed by 20° and capsized at 01:16. When the British attack began, Procione tangled its paravane and failed to sight Sirius until it had closed to 2,000 yd (0.99 nmi) on the starboard side and opened fire at 00:53. The shells killed the forward gun crew and the captain took evasive action then headed towards the south-west. Clio began to make smoke, firing at searchlights and gun flashes; De Recco tried to make a torpedo attack.

At 00:55 Quiberon broke formation to attack Clio, was bracketed by return fire. Sirius and Argonaut were firing on Puccini and at 00:58, Argonaut fired a torpedo at Puccini then one to port soon after at Aventino which was on fire. At 01:12 Sirius also launched a torpedo at Aventino which exploded and sank. At 01:16 Quiberon sailed through water full of survivors and attacked Puccini and at 01:12 Quentin followed Quiberon, both destroyers setting Puccini on fire; Aurora was engaging Aspromonte from 8,000 yd (3.9 nmi) which began to sink; the British cruisers changed target to Clio but after five minutes Clio escaped without damage. De Recco had got within 4,500 yd (2.2 nmi) of Force Q by 01:30 and launched torpedoes which missed; shell hits from Sirius, Quiberon and Quentin killed 118 members of the crew and left De Recco stopped in the water, eventually to be towed to port by Pigafetta. The British ships completed their circuit around the Italian ships and set course for Bône. Force Q was attacked by Luftwaffe torpedo bombers at 06:30 on 3 December, sinking Quentin with one torpedo and damaging Quiberon. (Note: In 2005, Rohwer and Hümmelchen wrote that Quentin was sunk by a bomb.)

== Aftermath ==
=== Analysis ===
In 1966 the British official historians wrote that Force Q has a "spectacular success"; in an hour, Force Q had sunk 7,800 long tons (7,900 t) of shipping during a "one-sided engagement" for no damage. Just after dawn, as Force Q was on the return journey to Bône, Quentin was sunk by a torpedo bomber. In 2009, Vincent O'Hara wrote that the battle was a serious Italian defeat, in which a large escort force had failed to prevent the four supply ships from being sunk. The minor damage inflicted by the Italian ships on their opponents stood in stark contrast, despite the convoy escorts managing to launch so many torpedoes at such close range. The convoy had been attacked while disorganised and could not achieve a co-ordinated reply. After more than two years of war, the Regia Marina was still incapable of accurately aiming torpedoes at night, partly because Supermarina accepted claims of torpedo hits uncritically, which obscured the significance of the failing.

=== Casualties ===
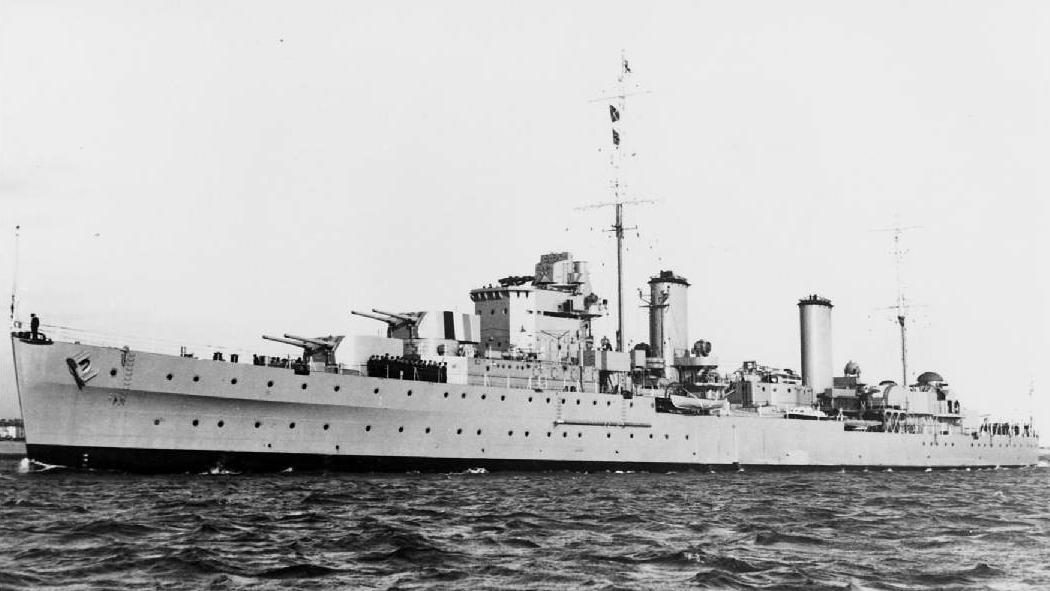
HMS Aurora, flagship of Force Q

Of the four freighters of Convoy H, three were sunk and one scuttled; the escort Folgore was also sunk. Two hundred members of the merchant and Regia Marina crews and 1,527 troops, embarked on Aventino and Puccini were killed. The crew of Folgore suffered 126 casualties, Nicoloso da Recco 118, Aspromonte 39, Procione three. The British ships had minor splinter damage but lost Quentin to a torpedo bomber on the return journey to Bône, with the loss of 20 men.

=== Subsequent operations ===
At 16:00 the 14th Destroyer Flotilla, from Force K, comprising HMS Jervis, Javelin, Nubian and Kelvin sailed from Malta, untroubled by Axis aircraft, to attack Convoy C, the merchant ships Veloce and Chisone en route for Tripoli, escorted by the torpedo boats Ardente, Aretusa and Lupo. Near the Kerkenah Banks, Fairey Albacores of the Fleet Air Arm torpedoed Veloce, which was carrying benzene and caught fire, burning brightly. Force K sailed towards the illumination as Lupo prepared to take on survivors and the rest of the convoy hugged the coast. Jervis lit up Lupo with a searchlight and opened fire at 2,000 yd (0.99 nmi; 1.1 mi; 1.8 km) surprising the Italian torpedo boat and destroying the bridge. The rest of the flotilla joined in and Lupo was unable to reply, all but twelve of the crew being killed. The rest of the convoy stole away into the shallow water of the Kerkenah Banks.

Convoy "B", a simultaneous Axis shipping move, composed of the Italian freighters Arlesiana, Achille Lauro and Campania and the German Menes and Lisboa, was sailing that night from Naples to Tunis. The cargo ships were escorted by the torpedo boats Groppo, Sirio, Pallade and Orione. After the convoy was overflown by Allied reconnaissance aircraft in the afternoon of 30 November, the escort was reinforced with the destroyers Maestrale, Ascari and Grecale, joined later by the torpedo boat Uragano. The convoy was recalled to Trapani when the presence of Force Q in the area was discovered by German aerial surveillance at 23:30. While sailing back, Convoy "B" witnessed the destruction of Convoy "H". Numerous flares were sighted to the south, in the direction of the Axis force. At 01:00, the commander of Maestrale, the leading escort, ordered the convoy to change course to Palermo, a route further to the north, to avoid detection by Force Q.

== Orders of battle ==
=== Force Q ===
Force Q
Ship	Flag	Type	Notes
HMS Aurora	Royal Navy	Arethusa-class cruiser	Flagship, Rear-Admiral Cecil Harcourt
HMS Argonaut	Royal Navy	Dido-class cruiser	
HMS Sirius	Royal Navy	Dido-class cruiser	
HMS Quentin	Royal Navy	Q-class destroyer	Sunk by torpedo-bombers, 2 December
HMAS Quiberon	Royal Navy	Q-class destroyer	

=== Convoy H ===
Convoy H
Ship	Year	Flag	GRT	Notes
Aspromonte	1921	Merchant Navy	976	Converted ferry
Aventino	1907	Merchant Navy	3,794	
KT-1	1942	Kriegsmarine	850	
Puccini	1928	Merchant Navy	2,433	

=== Convoy escorts ===
Convoy escorts
Ship	Flag	Type	Notes
Folgore	Kingdom of Italy	Folgore-class destroyer	Sunk 37°43'N, 11°16'E
Nicoloso da Recco	Kingdom of Italy	Navigatori-class destroyer	Flagship, damaged, towed home by Antonio Pigafetta
Camicia Nera	Kingdom of Italy	Soldati-class destroyer	
Procione	Kingdom of Italy	Orsa-class torpedo boat	Damaged
Clio	Kingdom of Italy	Spica-class torpedo boat	
