= Algerine (disambiguation) =

Algerine means someone from or something related to Algeria or Algiers. It may also refer to:

== Ships ==
- HMS Algerine, various ships of the Royal Navy
- Three ship classes:
  - Algerine-class minesweeper
  - Algerine-class gunboat
  - Algerine-class gunvessel

== In geography ==
- Algerine Island, Nunavut, Canada
- Algerine Channel, Nunavut, separating Patterson Island (Findlay Group) and Harrison Island
- Algerine Seamount, a seamount in the Atlantic Ocean

== Horses ==
- Algerine (horse) (1873–c. 1892), an American Thoroughbred racehorse, winner of the 1876 Belmont Stakes

== See also ==
- Algerino (disambiguation)
