= Arthur Talbot =

Arthur Talbot may refer to:

- Arthur Talbot (Royal Navy officer) (1892–1960), Royal Navy officer
- Arthur Newell Talbot (1857–1942), American civil engineer
