= Nicoloso da Recco =

14th-century navigator from Genoa

Nicoloso da Recco was a 14th-century Italian navigator from Genoa, who visited the Canary Islands in 1341 on behalf of Afonso IV of Portugal. He is credited with providing the first reliable account of the language used by the aboriginal inhabitants of the Canary Islands, the Guanches.

An Italian Navy destroyer, Nicoloso da Recco, bore his name during World War II.

== Biography ==
There is no reliable information about the origins of Nicoloso da Recco. Thanks to a collection by the writer Giovanni Boccaccio (De Canaria et insulis reliquis ultra Hispaniam in Oceano noviter repertis, ca. 1342), we know that, together with the Florentine Angiolino del Tegghia de' Corbizzi, he undertook an exploratory voyage to the Canary Islands in 1341 on behalf of Afonso IV of Portugal.

His name was given to a destroyer of the Italian destroyer Nicoloso da Recco that operated during World War II and to a freight liner of the Società Italia di Navigazione S.p.A. in the early 1970s, sister ship to the Da Noli and Da Verrazzano. In addition, a Douglas DC83-43 I-DIWR aircraft belonging to Alitalia airline was also named after him. A scientific and Liceo scientifico high school in the city of Recco also bears his name. A street in Pegli, one in Lecce and Marina di Campo, one in Civitavecchia, one in Limena, one in Cesenatico, a square in Recco, a square in Rome, a street in Catanzaro Lido, and a street in Cecina, Tuscany are named after him.
