= Algerino =

Algerino may refer to:

- L'Algérino (born 1981), French rapper of Algerian origin
- Jimmy Algerino (born 1971), French footballer
- Slang expression to describe someone from Scarborough, North Yorkshire, England

== See also ==
- Algerine (disambiguation)
