= List of task forces of the Royal Navy =

In the Royal Navy, a task force is a temporary grouping of naval units under one commander, formed for the purpose of carrying out a specific operation or mission they vary in size but usually comprise two or more task groups.

== History ==
Grouping combatant ships is as old as navies. Assemblies of warships was have been given the name fleets, divisions, or on the smaller scale, squadrons, and flotillas.

The term "task force" was popularized by the United States Navy in the course of the Second World War. A task force can be assembled using ships from different units and formations, without requiring a formal and permanent fleet reorganization. It can be easily dissolved following completion of the operational task they can be formed by a sole navy or as part of a combined operation involving naval forces from more than one country. A Joint Task Force groups elements from more than one armed service.

== "Forces" of the Royal Navy ==
Earlier in the Second World War, the British Royal Navy had already devised its own system of Forces, they mainly assigned a letter occasionally a number.

=== Allocated by letter ===
- Force A

Originally stationed at Malta took part in the Battle of Calabria in 1940 it transferred Trincomalee and became the fast force of the Eastern Fleet during the Indian Ocean raid April to May 1942.

- Force B

Originally stationed at Malta, took part in the Battle of Calabria on 9 July 1940, took part in the Battle of Cape Spartivento, 27 November 1940, was involved in the First Battle of Sirte, 17 December 1941 it then moved to Trincomalee in March 1942 and became the slow force, made up of R-class battleships, of the Eastern Fleet during the Indian Ocean raid April to May 1942.

- Force C

Formed during the Battle of Calabria.

- Force D

Stationed at Malta, took part in the Battle of Cape Spartivento, 27 November 1940.

- Force E
- Force F

Formed as part of a number of hunting task for groups 5 October 1939 as a prelude to Battle of the River Plate, 13 December 1939 was stationed at Malta, took part in the Battle of Cape Spartivento, 27 November 1940.

- Force G

Formed as part of a number of hunting task groups on 5 October 1939 as a prelude to Battle of the River Plate, 13 December 1939.

- Force H

Formed as part of a number of hunting task groups on 5 October 1939 as a prelude to Battle of the River Plate, 13 December 1939 and part of the South America Division after which it was stationed at, Gibraltar, took part in Operation Catapult, 3 July 1940, took part in Operation Rheinübung 19 May - 15 June 1941, took part in Operation Harpoon, took part in Operation Husky, 9 July-17 August 1942, also involved in Operation Torch as a component of a larger task force, 8–16 November 1942 the force was disbanded in September 1943.

- Force I

Stationed at Ceylon, formed as part of a number of hunting task groups on 5 October 1939 as a prelude to Battle of the River Plate, 13 December 1939.

- Force J

Covered North Atlantic, originally formed as part of a number of hunting task groups on 5 October 1939 as a prelude to Battle of the River Plate, 13 December 1939.

- Force K

Part of a number of hunting task groups on 5 October 1939 as a prelude to Battle of the River Plate, 13 December 1939 based in Freetown it was then stationed at, Malta, took part in the Battle of the Tarigo Convoy, 16 April 1941, was involved in the First Battle of Sirte, 17 December 1941 then moved to Freetown in December 1941.

- Force L,

Stationed at, Freetown, was part of a number of hunting task groups on 5 October 1939 as a prelude to Battle of the River Plate, 13 December 1939, took part in the Battle of Dakar, 23–25 September 1940.

- Force M

Formed at Freetown and placed under the Command of Vice-Admiral John D. Cunningham, it was assembled using available naval units from the Home Fleet and Force H and took part in the Battle of Dakar code-named 'Operation Menace'.

- Force O

Formed at the same time as Force S in October 1943 to prepare for the D-Day landings.

- Force Q

A sub-component of a larger covering force escorting Convoy PQ 13 20 March - 1 April 1942 was involved in the Battle of Skerki Bank, 2 December 1942.

- Force R

Formed at Murmansk and was involved at Battle of the Barents Sea and the Attack on Convoy JW 51B, 31 December 1942.

- Force S

Headquartered at Cameron Barracks, Inverness on 11 October 1943 to plan and prepare for the D-Day landings and led by Vice-Admiral Arthur Talbot.

- Force X

Originally formed at, Pernambuco-Dakar, transferred to the Mediterranean and took part in Operation Harpoon, 12–15 June 1942, also was involved in the Attack on Mers-el-Kébir, 3 July 1940.

- Force Y

Operational area was originally in the West Indies, was part of a number of hunting task groups on 5 October 1939 as a prelude to Battle of the River Plate, 13 December 1939, transferred to West Africa and was later allocated to the French component force during the Battle of Dakar, 23–25 September 1940.

- Force Z

Stationed at Singapore, known for the destruction of its two capital ships in the Sinking of Prince of Wales and Repulse.

=== Allocated by number ===
- Force 1

Formed to deal with the Tirpitz Sortie against convoys PQ 12 and QP8, 6–13 March 1942.

- Force 2

Formed to deal with the Tirpitz Sortie against convoys PQ12 and QP8, 6–13 March 1942.

- Force 61

Formed and took part in the Battle off Penang - the Battle of the Malacca Strait (Loss of IJN Haguro), 15 May 1945.

- Force 62

Formed 13 May 1945 and took part in the Battle off Penang - the Battle of the Malacca Strait.

- Force 67

Formed 13 May 1945 and took part in the Battle off Penang - the Battle of the Malacca Strait.

- Force 70

Formed 13 May 1945 and took part in the Battle off Penang - the Battle of the Malacca Strait.

== Task Force numbers allocated by the U.S. Navy ==
- Task Force 57 (USN allocated name)

Which was the composition of the British Pacific Fleet 23 March 1945.

- Task Force 37 (USN allocated name)

Formed to take part in the Carrier Raids on the Japanese Home Islands 24–28 July 1945.

=== Allied naval task forces ===
Both the Eastern Task Force and the Western Task Force were formed as part of the allied Normandy landings code named "Operation Neptune" taking place on 6 June 1944. It was the Royal Navy's largest ever naval force assembled for a specific operation. It was part of the Allied Naval Expeditionary Force under Admiral Bertram Ramsay.

- Western Task Force (Operation Torch)

Commanded by Rear-Admiral Henry Kent Hewitt USN this task force supported allied troop landings at Casablanca, Morocco as part of Operation Torch it consisted of 105 ships of all types.

- Central Task Force (Operation Torch)

Commanded by Commodore Thomas H. Troubridge RN this task force supported allied troop landings at Oran, Algeria as part of Operation Torch. Consisted of 105 ships of all types.

- Eastern Task Force (Operation Torch)

Commanded by Harold M. Burrough RN this task force supported allied troop landings at Algiers, Algeria as part of Operation Torch it consisted of 105 ships of all types.

- Task Force Peter

Consisted of 52 ships that took part in the Battle of Anzio, 22 January 1944; part of the larger Allied amphibious landing known as Operation Shingle.

- Task Force 111

== Post Second World War ==
After the Second World War, US/UK cooperation was supplemented by more multinational arrangements, which came to be regulated by the Combined Communications-Electronics Board via Allied Communications Publications. From the 1960s at least the Royal Navy has been allocated Task Force numbers in the 300s.

- Task Force 317 - active since the late 1960s. During the Falklands War in 1982 the Royal Navy's Falklands Task Force was allocated the number 317. It aimed to achieve sea and air supremacy in the Total Exclusion Zone, before the amphibious forces arrived. CINCFLEET served as Commander Task Force 317 (CTF 317).
- Task Force 318 - once utilized to undertake the evacuation of Aden also known as Operation Magister from 11 October 1967 to 25 January 1968.
