= HMS Algerine (J213) =

British lead ship of Algerine-class

Coordinates: 36°45′N 05°11′E

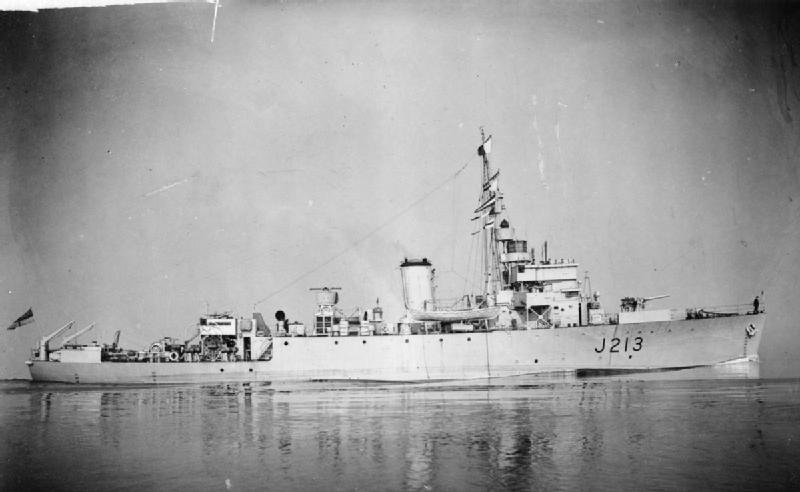
- Algerine in profile, with her pennant number visible

History

United Kingdom
- Name: HMS Algerine
- Ordered: 15 November 1940
- Builder: Harland & Wolff, Belfast
- Yard number: 1132
- Laid down: 15 March 1941
- Launched: 22 December 1941
- Completed: 24 March 1942
- Commissioned: 24 March 1942
- Identification: Pennant number: J213
- Fate: Sunk by a torpedo from the Ascianghi on 15 November 1942
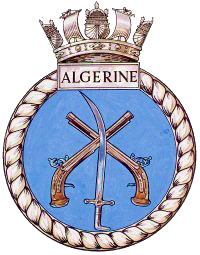
- Badge

General characteristics
- Class & type: Algerine-class minesweeper
- Displacement: 850 long tons (864 t) (standard); 1,125 long tons (1,143 t) (deep load)
- Length: 225 ft (68.6 m) o/a
- Beam: 35 ft 6 in (10.8 m)
- Draught: 11 ft (3.4 m) (deep load)
- Installed power: 2,000 shp (1,500 kW); 2 × Admiralty 3-drum boilers
- Propulsion: 2 × shafts; 2 × Parsons geared steam turbines
- Speed: 16.5 knots (30.6 km/h; 19.0 mph)
- Range: 5,000 nmi (9,300 km; 5,800 mi) at 10 knots (19 km/h; 12 mph)
- Complement: 85
- Sensors & processing systems: Type 271 surface-search radar; Type 291 air-search radar
- Armament: 1 × single 4-inch (102 mm) Mk V gun; 4 × twin 20-millimetre (0.8 in) Oerlikon autocannon; 2 × depth charge rails and 4 depth charge throwers

HMS Algerine was the lead ship of her namesake class of minesweepers built for the Royal Navy during World War II, the Algerine-class minesweepers. Initially assigned to the North Sea, she was transferred to lead the 12th Minesweeping Flotilla. The Flotilla were posted to the Mediterranean to assist with Operation Torch. In 1942, after a successful mine clearing operation off Bougie, she was torpedoed by the Ascianghi, causing Algerine to sink, leaving only eight survivors.

== Description ==
Algerine displaced 850 long tons (864 t) at standard load and 1,125 long tons (1,143 t) at deep load. The ship had an overall length of 225 feet (68.6 m), a beam of 35 feet 6 inches (10.8 m) and a draught of 8 feet 6 inches (2.6 m). She was powered by Parsons geared steam turbines, driving two shafts, which gave a maximum speed of 16.5 knots (30.6 km/h; 19.0 mph).

The ship mounted one single 4-inch (102 mm) Mk V gun. Algerine had four single mounts for 20-millimetre (0.8 in) Oerlikon 20 mm autocannon, and she was fitted with two depth charge rails, and four depth charge throwers.

== Career ==
Algerine was laid down on 15 March 1941, by Harland & Wolff, Belfast, and launched on 22 December 1941. She was the eighth ship of the Royal Navy to be named Algerine. After being completed, the ship was commissioned on 24 March 1942, and adopted by Sittingbourne due to a Warship Week campaign.

Algerine joined the 9th Minesweeping Flotilla in May 1942 and began action in minesweeping, escorting, and patrolling duties on the east side of England. She was proposed as leader for the 12th Minesweeping Flotilla, which would participate in action abroad. Her sister ships from the 9th Flotilla, Alarm and Albacore, joined her, as did Acute, and Cadmus. In October, she was put forward to go to the Mediterranean to assist Operation Torch, but her departure was delayed due to repair work. The other four ships in her flotilla left for Gibraltar as escorts to a convoy. Four days after the other ships left, Algerine escorted convoy KMF1 to Oran.

== Fate ==
In early November, she helped recover the escort destroyer Cowdray off Algiers after Cowdray was damaged by an aerial attack. On 15 November, Algerine and Alarm were positioned off Bougie, clearing mines. The mission had been successful, with 46 mines cleared; but, Algerine was torpedoed by the Italian Adua-class submarine Ascianghi, commanded by Lieutenant commander Rino Erler. The submarine had first fired two torpedoes at the middle ship in the trio, then fired another two torpedoes at the last ship, Algerine: Algerine suffered heavy casualties and sank. The auxiliary anti-aircraft ship Pozarica rescued 32 men, of whom only 8 survived, internal wounds killing 24. The survivors had been on a Carley raft. The final death toll was 84.

Algerine's wreck lies at 1,100 ft (340 m) on the northern coast of Algeria.

== Bibliography ==
- Lenton, H. T. (1998). British & Empire Warships of the Second World War. Annapolis, Maryland: Naval Institute Press. ISBN 1-55750-048-7.
- Rohwer, Jürgen (1992). Chronology of the War at Sea 1939–1945: The Naval History of World War Two (Second Revised ed.). Annapolis, Maryland: Naval Institute Press. ISBN 1-59114-119-2.
- Walsh, Ronald (2004). In the Company of Heroes (First ed.). Leicester: Troubador Publishing. ISBN 1-904744-47-8.
