= Arthur Talbot (Royal Navy officer) =

Royal Navy Vice Admiral (1892–1960)

Vice-Admiral Arthur Talbot CB DSO
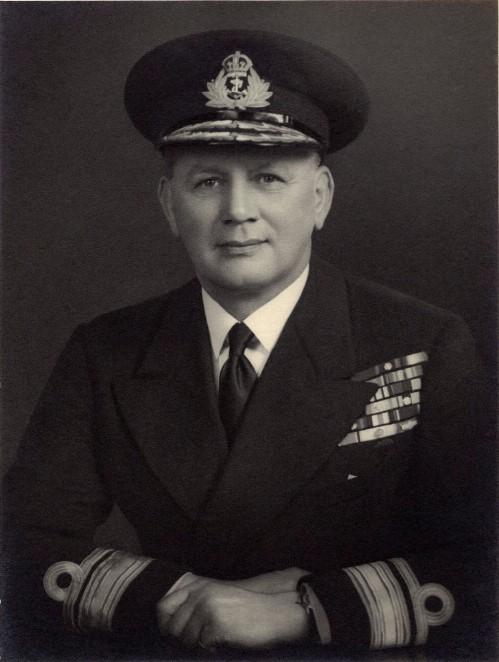
- Born: Arthur George Talbot; 31 March 1892
- Died: 1960 (aged 67–68)
- Military career
- Allegiance: United Kingdom
- Branch: Royal Navy
- Rank: Vice-Admiral
- Commands: HMS Inglefield; HMS Furious; HMS Illustrious; HMS Formidable; Force S
- Conflicts: World War II

Vice-Admiral Arthur George Talbot, CB, DSO (31 March 1892 – 1960) was a Royal Navy officer.

He commanded the flotilla leader Inglefield as Captain (D) of the Third Destroyer Flotilla in 1937–1939 and then commanded three different aircraft carriers from 1940 to 1943.

On 11 October 1943 he took command of the newly formed Force S to plan and prepare for the D-Day landings.

== Bibliography ==
- Halpern, Paul G., ed. (2016). The Mediterranean Fleet, 1930–1939. Publications of the Navy Records Society. Vol. 163. London: Routledge for the Navy Records Society. ISBN 978-1-4724-7597-8.
- Fisher, Stephen (23 May 2024). Sword Beach: The Untold Story of D-Day's Forgotten Victory. United Kingdom: Bantam. p. 496. ISBN 9781787636712.
