= Italian submarine Lazzaro Mocenigo =

Lazzaro Mocenigo or simply Mocenigo was the name of at least three ships of the Italian Navy named in honour of the Venetian admiral Lazzaro Mocenigo and may refer to:

- Italian submarine Lazzaro Mocenigo (1919), a Micca-class submarine launched in 1919 and discarded in 1937.
- Italian submarine Mocenigo, a Marcello-class submarine launched in 1937 and sunk in 1943.
- Italian submarine Lazzaro Mocenigo (S514), a Toti-class submarine launched in 1968 and decommissioned in 1993.
