= Italian destroyer Nicoloso da Recco =

Destroyer of the Regia Marina

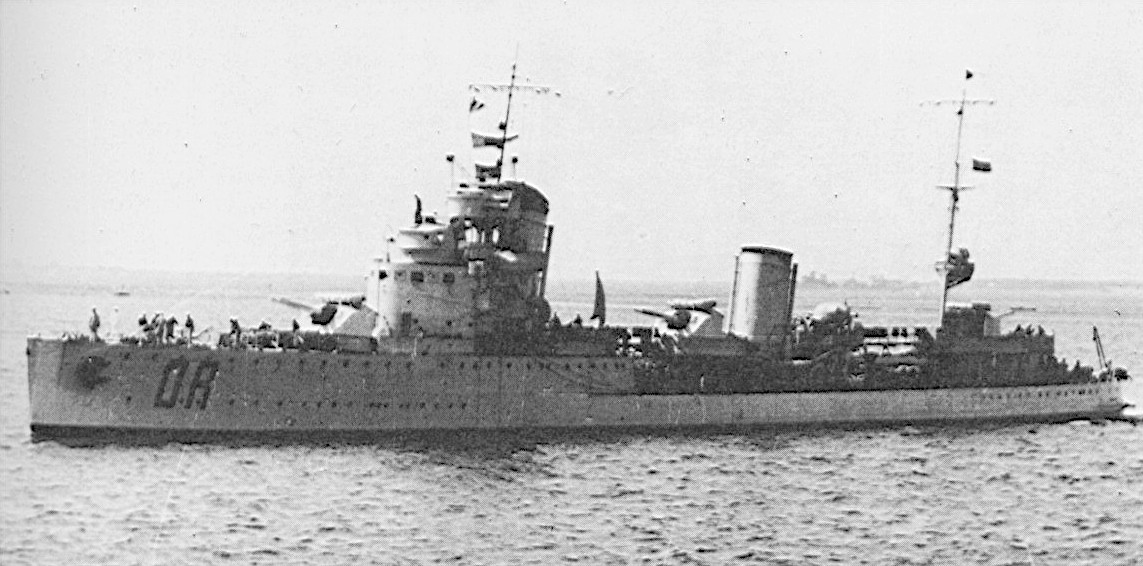

History

Italy
- Name: Nicoloso da Recco
- Namesake: Nicoloso da Recco
- Builder: Cantieri Riuniti dell'Adriatico
- Laid down: 14 December 1927
- Launched: 5 January 1930
- Commissioned: 20 May 1930
- Stricken: 15 July 1954
- Fate: Scrapped 1954

General characteristics (as built)
- Class & type: Navigatori-class destroyer
- Displacement: 1,900 long tons (1,930 t) (standard); 2,580 long tons (2,621 t) (full load)
- Length: 107.3 m (352 ft 0 in)
- Beam: 10.2 m (33 ft 6 in)
- Draught: 3.5 m (11 ft 6 in)
- Installed power: 4 water-tube boilers; 55,000 hp (41,000 kW)
- Propulsion: 2 shafts; 2 geared steam turbines
- Speed: 32 knots (59.3 km/h; 36.8 mph)
- Range: 3,800 nmi (7,000 km; 4,400 mi) at 18 knots (33 km/h; 21 mph)
- Complement: 222–225 (wartime)
- Armament: 3 × twin 120 mm (4.7 in) guns; 2 × single 40 mm (1.6 in) AA guns; 4 × twin 13.2 mm (0.52 in) machine guns; 2 × triple 533 mm (21 in) torpedo tubes

Nicoloso da Recco was one of a dozen Navigatori-class destroyers built for the Regia Marina (Royal Italian Navy) in 1930. Named after the Italian Renaissance seaman Nicoloso da Recco, she served during World War II in which she was the sole survivor of her destroyer class. She shot down three Beaufort bombers while escorting a two-freighter convoy on 21 June 1942 off Tunisia. On 2 December 1942 Nicoloso Da Recco took part of the Battle of Skerki Bank, where an Italo-German convoy carrying troops and supplies to Libya was obliterated by Allied naval forces. Nicoloso Da Recco was the only vessel of her class to survive the war, and was eventually scrapped in July 1954.

== Design and description ==
The Navigatori-class destroyers were designed to counter the large French destroyers of the Jaguar and Guépard classes. They had an overall length of 107.3 meters (352 ft), a beam of 10.2 meters (33 ft 6 in) and a mean draft of 3.5 meters (11 ft 6 in). They displaced 1,900 metric tons (1,900 long tons) at standard load, and 2,580 metric tons (2,540 long tons) at deep load. Their complement during wartime was 222–225 officers and enlisted men.

Nicoloso da Recco was powered by two Tosi geared steam turbines, each driving one propeller shaft using steam supplied by four Odero water-tube boilers. The turbines were designed to produce 55,000 shaft horsepower (41,000 kW) and a speed of 32 knots (59 km/h; 37 mph) in service, although the Navigatoris reached speeds of 38–41 knots (70–76 km/h; 44–47 mph) during their sea trials while lightly loaded. They carried enough fuel oil to give them a range of 3,800 nautical miles (7,000 km; 4,400 mi) at a speed of 18 knots (33 km/h; 21 mph).

Their main battery consisted of six 120-millimeter (4.7 in) guns in three twin-gun turrets, one each fore and aft of the superstructure and the third amidships. Anti-aircraft (AA) defense for the Navigatori-class ships was provided by a pair of 40-millimeter (1.6 in) AA guns in single mounts abreast the forward funnel and a pair of twin-gun mounts for 13.2-millimeter (0.52 in) machine guns. They were equipped with six 533-millimeter (21 in) torpedo tubes in two triple mounts amidships. Unlike her sister ships, Nicoloso da Recco was unable to carry any mines because her aft superstructure had been enlarged to accommodate an admiral and his staff.

== Construction and career ==
Nicoloso da Recco was laid down by Cantieri Navali Riuniti at their Ancona shipyard on 14 December 1927, launched on 5 January 1930 and commissioned on 20 May.

== Bibliography ==
- Ando, Elio (1978). "The Italian Navigatori Class, 1928". In Preston, Antony (ed.). Super Destroyers. Warship Special. Vol. 2. London: Conway Maritime Press. ISBN 0-85177-131-9.
- Brescia, Maurizio (2012). Mussolini's Navy: A Reference Guide to the Regina Marina 1930–45. Annapolis, Maryland: Naval Institute Press. ISBN 978-1-59114-544-8.
- Fraccaroli, Aldo (1968). Italian Warships of World War II. Shepperton, UK: Ian Allan. ISBN 0-7110-0002-6.
- Roberts, John (1980). "Italy". In Chesneau, Roger (ed.). Conway's All the World's Fighting Ships 1922–1946. New York: Mayflower Books. pp. 280–317. ISBN 0-8317-0303-2.
- Rohwer, Jürgen (2005). Chronology of the War at Sea 1939–1945: The Naval History of World War Two (3rd rev. ed.). Annapolis, Maryland: Naval Institute Press. ISBN 1-59114-119-2.
- Shores, Christopher F.; Cull, Brian & Malizia, Nicola (1991). Malta: The Spitfire Year. London: Grub Street. ISBN 978-0-948817-16-8.
- Whitley, M. J. (1988). Destroyers of World War 2: An International Encyclopedia. Annapolis, Maryland: Naval Institute Press. ISBN 1-85409-521-8.
