= HMS Algerine =

Eight ships of the Royal Navy have been named HMS Algerine:

- HMS Algerine (1810) was a 10-gun schooner launched in 1810 and wrecked in 1813.
- HMS Algerine was originally a 12-gun gun-brig, formerly the French Pierre Cézar. She was captured in 1808 and named HMS Tigress. In 1814, she was converted into a 14-gun cutter under the name HMS Algerine and was sold in 1818.
- HMS Algerine (1823) was a 10-gun brig-sloop under the command of Commander Charles Wemyss when she was lost off Hydra in a squall in early 1826.
- HMS Algerine (1829) was a 10-gun Cherokee-class brig-sloop launched in 1829 and sold in 1844.
- HMS Algerine (1857) was an Algerine-class wooden screw gunboat launched in 1857, sold into mercantile service in 1872 and broken up in 1894.
- HMS Algerine (1880) was an Algerine-class gunvessel built by Harland and Wolff, launched in 1880, and displacing 835 tons. She was sold in 1892.
- HMS Algerine (1895) was a Phoenix-class sloop launched in 1895, displacing 1050 tons. She was on the China Station during the Boxer Rebellion, and was sold in 1919 and wrecked in 1923.
- HMS Algerine (J213) was an Algerine-class minesweeper launched in 1941 and sunk in 1942.
