= Skerki Banks =

Coordinates: 37°47′N 10°46′E

- Submerged bank Skerki Banks (Mediterranean)
- Interactive map of Skerki Banks
- Reefs: Esquirques and Keith's Reef

The Skerki Banks, also known as the Skerki Channel, are an area of relatively shallow open sea, situated in the central Mediterranean in the Strait of Sicily between Sicily and Tunisia.

Known reefs in the area include the Esquirques, two large rocky reefs of volcanic origin surrounded by a sandbank, and Keith's Reef.

Since 1988, various archaeological surveys have located a concentration of ancient shipwrecks in the area. The site of these ancient wrecks was discovered by Robert Ballard and later explored by both Ballard and Anna Marguerite McCann.

The area is adjacent to the Skerki Narrows between Sicily and Cape Bon and was known as "Bomb Alley" to Allied sailors during World War II due to its proximity to Axis air bases and the difficulty of protecting convoys from air attack. On 2 December 1942 it was the site of the Battle of Skerki Bank, where a squadron of Allied cruisers destroyed an Italian convoy.

In September 2022, archaeologists from eight countries started collaborating with UNESCO to explore the Skerki Banks—particularly the unexplored Tunisian side of it—and look for possible shipwrecks on the seafloor.
