= Two Brothers Rocks =

Coordinates: 37°05′08″N 15°18′06″E

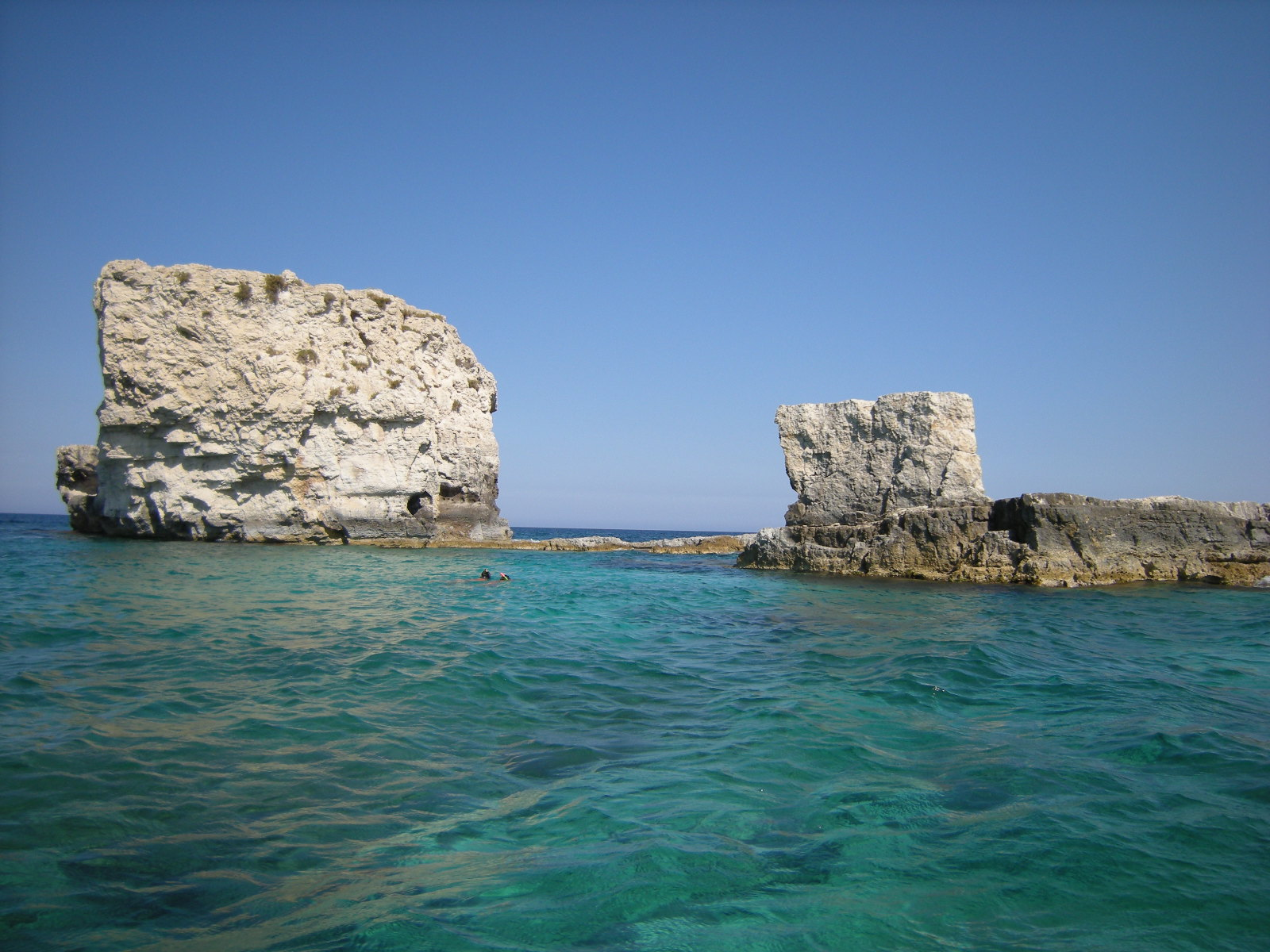
The Two Brothers Rocks

The Two Brothers Rocks (Italian: Scoglio Due Fratelli; Sicilian I Ru' Frati) are a rock formation in the Ionian Sea to the north-east of Syracuse in Sicily.

== Geography ==
The two rocks are located between the districts of Grottasanta, Mazzarona and Tunis Avenue, in a bay called "Coast of Piliceddi". The coasts in the area are jagged, except for a small beach formed by the disintegration of the rocks. The depth of the sea does not exceed 20 meters.

=== The rocks ===
- The "Big Rock" is 70 meters from the coast and is over 12 meters high. It is called the elephant or mastodon because of its shape. It is divided in half by a narrow fissure which starts at sea level and extends to the top of the rock, forming two caves. The back is exposed to the open sea and is composed of sharp rocks and holes caused by wave erosion. The front is perpendicular to the sea and is exposed to the bay. It is one of the best-known sets of rocks near Syracuse, because of the legend of the two brothers and also because of the actual death of a boy around 12 years old. He died trying to get into the lower part of the rock (the footbridge).
- The "Little Rock" is approximately 50 meters from the coast and is 5 meters high. It has the form of a small boat. It is roughly 12 meters from the big rock, thus there is space for boats to pass between them. The highest part of the rock, on the left, is flat and perpendicular to the sea. On the right, it slides down to sea level and has many holes and sharp points because of its exposure to the open sea.

== Legend of the two brothers ==
Three versions:

1. One day, two brothers came to go spearfishing. One of them dove under the water and became stuck in a crack. The other dove in to save him, but both drowned.
2. One sunny day, two brothers decided to jump from the bigger rock. The two brothers climbed the rock but before they jumped, the sea became turbulent and agitated. They jumped and were drowned in the waves.
3. The third version compares the two rocks to two brothers; an older brother and younger brother.

== Flora and fauna ==
Both the flora and fauna are typical of the Mediterranean. There are several species of aquatic plants, mostly neptune grass. The fauna is composed of crabs, shellfish, sea urchins, octopus, starfish, fish of various species, moray eels, and there can be stingrays. In 2005, there was an influx of jellyfish, mostly Pelagia noctiluca. Other seaside towns saw an increase in jellyfish. The Pelagia noctiluca is very irritating and has hurt many people whom have tried to swim.

== Tourism ==
Tourism is mainly present in the summer, between the months of June and September. The tourists who come to visit this place are particularly attracted by the beauty of the sea and the landscape of jagged cliffs. There are boat tours driven by professionals, which take tourists to visit the sea and rocks. The tour, lasting about half an hour, begins from the island of Ortigia, then passes from the coast of sea grottoes of Syracuse, and finally arrives at the "Two Brothers", where it stops for a few minutes to give tourists the possibility to swim. Afterward, they repeated the same round, bringing the tourists to Ortigia.

This is a particularly suitable place to spend some time in contact with marine nature, repose and also for fun. The two rocks are also a great place for diving. There is also practiced spearfishing, given the abundance of the fauna.

== How to reach the rocks ==
The two rocks are accessible through the Via Sicilia, situated in the district of Grottasanta. Going from this to its end, and turning right, there is a destroyed wall, and immediately after the bike path. After this there is a large lawn by Mediterranean, bounded by cliffs overlooking the sea ("Coast of Piliceddi"), and from there the two rocks are visible. Walking centrally towards the cliff, you will reach a cliff with a short, steep descent, where you can see the stairs carved into the rock of ancient origin. Going down toward the reef closest to the sea, one arrives at a small peninsula, where the rocks of "Two Brothers" are only accessible by the sea. Somewhere between the mainland and the rocks there are around 60 meters of distance.

== See also ==
- Syracuse
- Ortygia
