= HMS Quentin =

Destroyer of the Royal Navy

Coordinates: 37°32′N 08°32′E

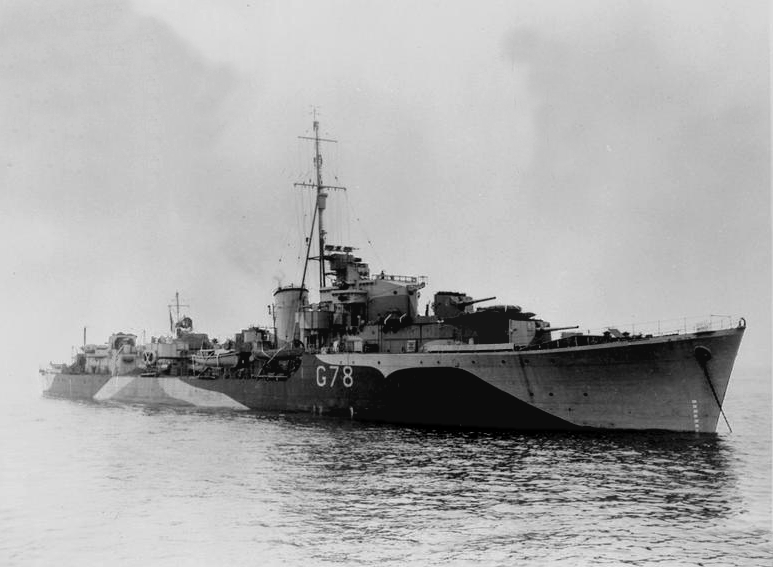
- HMS Quentin (G78)

History

United Kingdom
- Name: HMS Quentin
- Builder: J. Samuel White and Company
- Laid down: 25 September 1940
- Launched: 5 November 1941
- Commissioned: 15 April 1942
- Identification: Pennant number: G78
- Fate: Torpedoed, 2 December 1942

General characteristics Q class
- Type: Destroyer
- Displacement: 1,692 long tons (1,719 t); 2,411 long tons (2,450 t) full load
- Length: 358.25 ft (109.2 m) o/a
- Beam: 35.75 ft (10.9 m)
- Draught: 9.5 ft (2.9 m)
- Propulsion: 2 × Admiralty three-drum boilers, Parsons geared steam turbines, 40,000 shp (30,000 kW) on 2 shafts
- Speed: 36 kn (67 km/h)
- Range: 4,675 nmi (8,658 km) at 20 knots (37 km/h)
- Complement: 176 (225 as flotilla leader)
- Sensors & processing systems: Radar Type 290 air warning; Radar Type 285 ranging & bearing
- Armament: 4 × QF 4.7 in (119 mm) Mk.IX guns, single mounts CP Mk.XVIII; 4 × QF 2 pdr Mk.VIII (40 mm L/39), quad mount Mk.VII; 6 × QF 20 mm Oerlikon, single mount P Mk.III; 8 (2×4) tubes for 21 in (533 mm) torpedoes Mk.IX; up to 3 × throwers & 3 × racks, to 45 depth charges

HMS Quentin was a Q-class destroyer laid down by J. Samuel White and Company, Limited, at Cowes on the Isle of Wight on 25 September 1940, launched on 5 November 1941 and commissioned on 15 April 1942. She saw service during the Second World War before being sunk in 1942 by German aircraft off North Africa.

== Service history ==
Quentin attacked and sank the German submarine U-162 with the aid of destroyers Vimy and Pathfinder in the Caribbean Sea near Trinidad on 3 September 1942. Quentin and the Australian destroyer HMAS Quiberon depth charged and sank the Italian submarine Dessiè off Algeria on 28 November 1942. Quentin was torpedoed by German aircraft and sank off North Africa on 2 December 1942 with the loss of 20 men, only hours after participating in the Battle of Skerki Bank.
