= HMAS Quiberon =

Australian royal navy ship

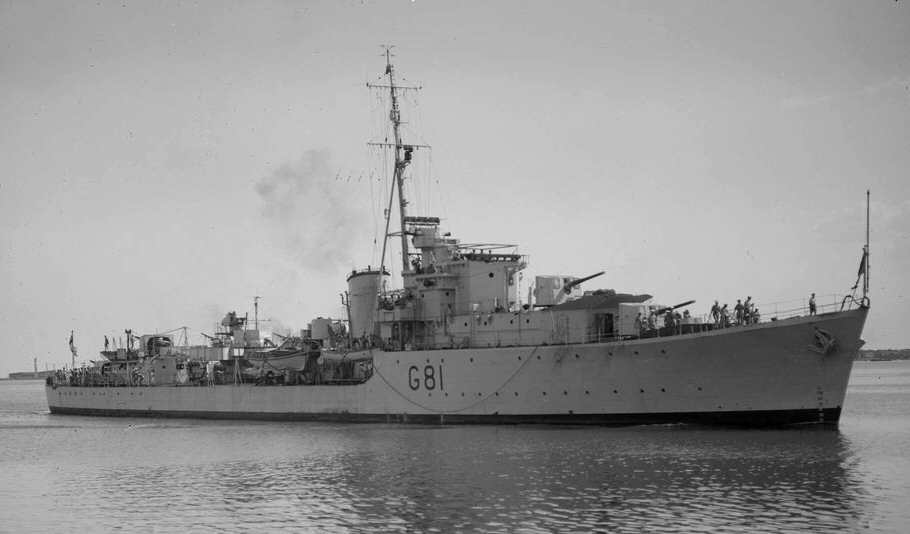
- HMAS Quiberon

History

Australia
- Namesake: Battle of Quiberon Bay, 1759
- Builder: J. Samuel White
- Laid down: 14 October 1940
- Launched: 31 January 1942
- Commissioned: 6 July 1942
- Decommissioned: 26 June 1964
- Reclassified: Anti-submarine frigate (1954)
- Motto: "Seek and Subdue"
- Honours and awards: Battle honours: Mediterranean 1942; North Africa 1942–43; Atlantic 1943; Indian Ocean 1943–44; East Indies 1944; Pacific 1944–45; Okinawa 1945; Japan 1945
- Fate: Sold for scrap in 1972

General characteristics (as launched)
- Class & type: Q-class destroyer
- Displacement: 1,705 tons standard; 2,424 tons deep load
- Length: 361 ft 1.5 in (110.071 m) length overall; 339 ft 6 in (103.48 m) between perpendiculars
- Beam: 35 ft 8 in (10.87 m)
- Propulsion: 2 Admiralty 3-drum boilers, Parsons Impulse turbines, 40,000 shp (30,000 kW)
- Speed: 32.7 knots (60.6 km/h; 37.6 mph)
- Range: 1,150 nautical miles (2,130 km; 1,320 mi) at 32 knots (59 km/h; 37 mph); 3,560 nautical miles (6,590 km; 4,100 mi) at 8 knots (15 km/h; 9.2 mph)
- Complement: 8 officers, 181 sailors
- Armament: 4 × QF 4.7-inch (120 mm) guns; 1 × quadruple 2-pounder (40 mm) pom-pom AA guns; 6 × 20 mm Oerlikon AA guns; 4 × Depth charge throwers; 2 × quadruple 21-inch (533 mm) torpedo tube sets

General characteristics (post conversion)
- Type: Modified Type 15 frigate
- Draught: 15.5 ft (4.7 m)
- Range: 4,040 nautical miles (7,480 km; 4,650 mi) at 16 knots (30 km/h; 18 mph)

HMAS Quiberon (G81/D20/D281/F03) was a Q-class destroyer of the Royal Australian Navy (RAN). Although built for the Royal Navy and remaining British property until 1950, Quiberon was one of two Q-class destroyers commissioned into the RAN during World War II. She was passed into full RAN ownership in 1950, and converted into an anti-submarine frigate.

== Design and construction ==
Quiberon was one of eight Q-class destroyers constructed as a flotilla under the War Emergency Programme. These ships had a standard displacement of 1,705 tons, and a deep load displacement of 2,424 tons. Quiberon was 361 feet 1.5 inches (110.071 m) long overall, and 339 feet 6 inches (103.48 m) long between perpendiculars, with a beam of 35 feet 8 inches (10.87 m). Propulsion was provided by two Admiralty 3-drum boilers connected to Parsons Impulse turbines, which generated 40,000 shaft horsepower (30,000 kW) for the propeller shafts. Quiberon achieved a maximum speed of 32.7 knots (60.6 km/h; 37.6 mph) during full-power trials. At 32 knots (59 km/h; 37 mph), she had a range of only 1,150 nautical miles (2,130 km; 1,320 mi), but could travel 3,560 nautical miles (6,590 km; 4,100 mi) at 8 knots (15 km/h; 9.2 mph). The ship's company consisted of 8 officers and 181 sailors.

The ship's main armament consisted of four QF 4.7 inch Mk IX guns in single turrets. This was supplemented by a quadruple 2-pounder pom-pom, and six 20 mm Oerlikon anti-aircraft guns. Four depth-charge throwers were fitted, with a payload of 70 charges carried, and two quadruple 21-inch torpedo tube sets were fitted, although a maximum of eight torpedoes were carried.

Quiberon was laid down by J. Samuel White and Company at their shipyard in Cowes, on the Isle of Wight, on 14 October 1940. She was launched on 31 January 1942 by the wife of Rear Admiral S. D. Tillard, Flag Officer in Charge, Southampton. Quiberon was commissioned into the RAN on 6 July 1942. Although commissioned as an Australian ship, the destroyer initially remained the property of the Royal Navy. The ship was named after the Battle of Quiberon Bay, which occurred in 1759.

== Operational history ==
=== World War II ===
Quiberon first served on North Atlantic convoy escort duty, operating out of Scapa Flow. She was assigned to support the Allied landings in North Africa in October 1942. On 28 November, Quiberon attacked and sank the Italian submarine Dessiè off the Tunisian coast. After this, the destroyer was assigned to "Force Q", which was based at Bône and consisted of three cruisers and two other Q-class destroyers.

==== Battle of Skerki Bank ====
Around midnight on 1 December, Force Q located and attacked an Italian convoy of four merchant ships and escorting destroyers about 40 miles (64 km) to the north of Cape Bon. All four supply ships, carrying mostly troops and munitions, were sunk, and at 01:35 on 2 December Quiberon fired the final shot into the Italian torpedo boat Lupo which was part of the escort of another convoy. While returning to port, sister ship HMS Quentin was torpedoed by a German aircraft: Quiberon evacuated most of the other destroyer's personnel. On 21 December, Quiberon rescued survivors from the passenger vessel Strathallen.

==== Indian Ocean and Pacific service ====
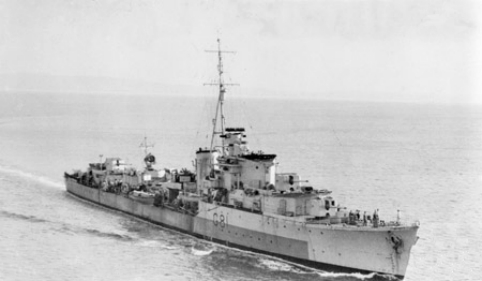
Quiberon in 1945

In January 1943, the destroyer escorted a convoy from England to Cape Town, then made for Victoria, Australia for refit. After work was completed, Quiberon was assigned to the British Eastern Fleet, primarily as a convoy escort across the Indian Ocean. In July 1943, the ship rescued survivors from Jasper Park, that was sunk by U-boat U-177. In April 1944, the destroyer was part of the carrier escort screen during Operation Cockpit, then again in May for Operation Transom: air raids against Japanese forces occupying the Dutch East Indies. After a brief refit in Melbourne, Quiberon resumed operations with the Eastern Fleet in August. In October, she took part in a series of fleet bombardments of the Japanese-held Nicobar Islands. In mid December, Quiberon was reassigned to Australian waters as a convoy escort and anti-submarine patrol vessel. During early 1945, the destroyer was attached to the British Pacific Fleet. Operating from Manus Island, Quiberon took part in operations in support of the American seizure of Okinawa and attacks on the Japanese home islands.

==== Immediate post-war service ====
At the end of World War II, Quiberon was present at the Allied reoccupation of Singapore, and spent the period until February 1946 operating in the East Indies to help reestablish Dutch control, move troops, and repatriate prisoners-of-war. The ship received eight battle honours for her wartime service: "Mediterranean 1942", "North Africa 1942–43", "Atlantic 1943", "Indian Ocean 1943–44", "East Indies 1944", "Pacific 1945", "Okinawa 1945", and "Japan 1945". Between 1946 and 1948, Quiberon was deployed with the British Commonwealth Occupation Force on three occasions.

=== Frigate conversion ===
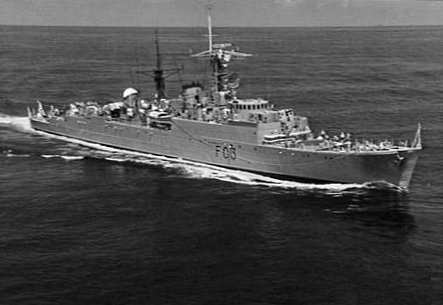
Quiberon's post-conversion configuration.

In early 1950, the decision was made to convert all five Q-class destroyers in RAN service (three more had been acquired after World War II) to anti-submarine warfare frigates, similar to the Type 15 frigate conversions performed on several War Emergency Programme destroyers of the RN. A proposal was made by the Australian government to pay for the upgrade to the five on-loan vessels, at the predicted cost of AU£400,000 each. Instead, the British Admiralty presented the ships to the RAN on 1 June as gifts. The conversions were part of an overall plan to improve the anti-submarine warfare capability of the RAN, although Quiberon and the other ships were only a 'stopgap' measure until purpose-built ASW frigates could be constructed.

Quiberon paid off on 15 May 1950 for conversion at Cockatoo Island Dockyard and Garden Island Dockyard in Sydney. She was recommissioned on 18 December 1957.

=== Post-conversion service ===
Quiberon served in the Far East with the Commonwealth Strategic Reserve and as a unit of the Australian Fleet on the Australia Station. The frigate made a port visit to Burma in 1959; the last RAN vessel to do so until HMAS Childers in 2014.

In October 1962 Quiberon together with HMAS Queenborough rescued 25 survivors from the Panamaian merchant steamer Kawi, which sank after being caught in a storm in the South China Sea. In December 1962, again with HMAS Queenborough, HMAS Quiberon rescued the crew of the SS Tuscany, which had run aground on a reef in the South China Sea.

== Decommissioning and fate ==
Quiberon paid off to reserve on 26 June 1964. She was sold for scrap to the Fujita Salvage Company Limited of Osaka, Japan on 15 February 1972, and left Sydney under tow on 10 April 1972.
