= List of foreign ships wrecked or lost in the Spanish Civil War =

The following is a list of foreign ships wrecked or lost during the Spanish Civil War (1936–1939). Only one of these vessels lost belonged to a foreign navy – Chasseur 91, a French antisubmarine patrol boat – the remainder being civilian ships from different countries, most of them merchantmen involved in maritime trade with the Spanish Republic.

== List of ships ==
Foreign ships sunk, wrecked or lost while involved in shipping along Spain from July 1936 to April 1939.

=== British flag ===
Name and date of loss	Ship's owner	Type of incident	Aftermath
(United Kingdom) African Mariner, 6,581 ton 22 January 1939	(United Kingdom) African & Continental, London	Air attack at Barcelona	Raised by Nationalist ships on 18 April 1939 and renamed Castillo Montjuich
(United Kingdom) Alcira, 1,387 ton 4 February 1938	(United Kingdom) J. Bruce & Co., Glasgow	Air attack off Barcelona	Sunk in deep waters
(United Kingdom) Arlon, 4,903 ton 27 June 1938	(United Kingdom) Arlon S.S. Co.	Air attack at Valencia	Set ablaze - Towed outside the port and sunk
(United Kingdom) Blue Shadow, 34 ton 9 August 1936	(United States) Eloise Drake	Surface action - Shelled by the Nationalist cruiser Almirante Cervera at Gijón	Yacht wrecked, skipper killed. American owner Eloise Drake and two members of the crew wounded, rescued by destroyer HMS Comet. (Note: The owner later salvaged the hull, which remained docked at England in 1939, after Ms. Drake purchased another yacht in 1938.)
(United Kingdom) Dellwyn, 1,451 ton 27 July 1938	(United Kingdom) Dillwyn S. S. Co., Swansea	Air attack at Gandia	Raised by Nationalist ships on 10 May 1939 and renamed Castilla Montesa
(United Kingdom) Eleni, 1,138 ton 30 November 1938	(United Kingdom) Inter Levant Co. Ltd.	Air attack at Águilas	Raised by Nationalist ships in 1940 and renamed Castillo Vera
(United Kingdom) Endymion, 887 ton 21 January 1938	(United Kingdom) Verano S.S. Co., Gibraltar	Torpedoed and sunk by the Nationalist submarine General Sanjurjo off Cape Tiñoso	Sunk in deep waters. Submarine's commander dismissed after British protest
(United Kingdom) English Tanker, 5,387 ton 6 June 1938	Spanish Republic; Campsa-Gentibus, Madrid	Air attack at Alicante	Raised by Nationalist ships on 26 April 1939 and renamed Castillo Almenara
(United Kingdom) Farnham, 4,793 ton 27 June 1938	(United Kingdom) Alpha S.S. Co., London	Air attack at Alicante	Raised by Nationalist ships on 27 June 1939 and renamed Castillo Montiel
(United Kingdom) Foynes, 822 ton 27 June 1937	Limerick S.S. Co., Limerick	Air attack at Valencia	Raised by Nationalist ships in 1940 and renamed Castillo Riaza
(United Kingdom) Greatend, 1,495 ton 28 May 1938	(United Kingdom) NewbiginS.S. Co., Newcastle	Air attack at Valencia	Raised by Nationalist ships on 24 November 1938 and renamed Castillo Noreña
(United Kingdom) Isadora, 1,324; 9 June 1938	(United Kingdom) Stone & Rolfe, Belfast	Air attack at Castellon	Raised by Nationalist ships in 1939 and renamed Castillo Frías
(United Kingdom) Jean Weems, 2,349 tons 30 October 1937	(United Kingdom) Thameside Ship Co., London	Air attack off Santander	Sunk in deep waters
(United Kingdom) Lake Lugano, 2,120 ton 28 January 1939	(United Kingdom) Strubin & Co., London	Damaged by air attack on 6 August 1938; abandoned and eventually beached off Palamos; Surface action - Shelled and wrecked in situ by the Nationalist auxiliary cruiser Mar Negro (Note: Republican sources claim that Lake Lugano was shelled by the heavy cruiser Canarias, but the only naval bombardment on a British freighter at Palamós recorded by Nationalist reports on this date was actually carried out by Mar Negro.)	Sunk in shallow waters (Note: Still visible via satellital images at 41°50′50″N 03°07′09″E)
(United Kingdom) Lucky, 1,235 ton 10 February 1938	(United Kingdom) Toussi Ship Co., Gibraltar	Air attack at Valencia	Raised by Nationalist ships on 24 May 1939 and renamed Castillo Benisano
(United Kingdom) Miocene, 2,153 ton 24 January 1939	Spanish Republic; Campsa-Gentibus, Madrid	Air attack at Barcelona	Raised by Nationalist ships in 1940 but eventually scrapped in 1944
(United Kingdom) Penthames, 3,995 ton 31 May 1938	(United Kingdom) D. P. Barnett, London	Air attack off Valencia	Sunk in deep waters
(United Kingdom) St. Winifred, 5,683 ton 6 June 1938	(United Kingdom) Barry Shipping Co. Ltd.	Air attack at Alicante	Heavily damaged. Hull sold to an Italian company which rebuilt her as Capo Vita.
(United Kingdom) Stanburgh, 1,095 ton 4 November 1938	(United Kingdom) Billmeir, London	Internal explosion off Sète, France, while on passage to Barcelona	Beached and later scrapped
(United Kingdom) Stancroft, 1,407 ton 27 December 1938	(United Kingdom) Billmeir, London	Air attack at Barcelona	Raised by Nationalist ships on 24 April 1939 and renamed Castillo Almansa
(United Kingdom) Standale, 2,456 ton 12 May 1937	(United Kingdom) Billmeir, London	Foundered off Berlengas islands while bound to Cartagena	Sank in deep waters
(United Kingdom) Stangrove, 516 ton 23 February 1939	(United Kingdom) Billmeir, London	Surface action - Shelled and seized by the Nationalist gunboat Dato off Cap de Creus	Ran aground in a gale while in custody at Palma de Mallorca. Skipper killed in the wreckage. Raised by Nationalist ships in 1941 and renamed Castilla del Oro (Condestable in 1944)
(United Kingdom) Sunion, 3,054 ton 22 June 1938	(United Kingdom) African & Continental S.S. Co., London	Air attack off Valencia	Sunk in deep waters
(United Kingdom) Thorpehall, 1,251 ton 25 May 1938	(United Kingdom) Westcliff S.S., London	Air attack off Valencia	Sunk in deep waters
(United Kingdom) Thorpeheaven, 3,683 ton 10 June 1938	(United Kingdom) Westcliff S.S. Co., London	Air attack at Alicante	Raised by Nationalist ships on 18 May 1938 and renamed Castillo Guadalest
(United Kingdom) Thorpeness, 4,798 ton 21 June 1938	(United Kingdom) Westcliff S.S. Co., London	Air attack off Valencia	Sunk in deep waters
(United Kingdom) Ulmus, 2,733 ton 18 January 1939	(United Kingdom) Reardon Smith, Cardiff	Accidental fire at the Strait of Gibraltar	Abandoned. Salvaged and towed to Gibraltar. (Note: Seized by Italian authorities while being rebuilt at Savona in a shipyard on 10 June 1940, when Italy entered World War II)
(United Kingdom) Woodford, 6,987 ton 1 September 1937	Spanish Republic; Cº Primera de Navegación, Ltd.	Torpedoed and sunk by the Italian submarine Diaspro off Columbretes islands	Sunk in deep waters
(United Kingdom) Yorkbrook, 1,370 ton 13 October 1938	(United Kingdom) Angel Sons & Co., Cardiff	Air attack at Barcelona	Raised by Nationalist ships on 16 January 1940 renamed Castillo Monteagudo. (Note: Captured by the Nationalist cruiser Canarias off Bilbao, rescued and forcibly taken to Bermeo by the Basque naval trawler Bizcaia on 4 March 1937. Captured again by Nationalist armed trawlers and minelayer Júpiter on 5 October 1938. Released 20 November)

=== French flag ===
Name and date of loss	Ship's owner	Type of Incident	Aftermath
(France) Artois, 439 ton 14 August 1938	(France) Marseille Maritime, Marseille	Hit a mine while en route from Marseille to Oran	Sank in depth waters
(France) Aunis, 439 ton 15 January 1939	(France) Marseille Maritime, Marseille	Surface action - Seized by the Nationalist gunboat Dato	Confiscated and renamed Castillo Valldemosa
(France) Azelma, 177 ton 25 January 1939	(France) unknown	Air attack at Sant Feliu de Guíxols	Raised by Nationalist ships in 1940 renamed Castillo Javier
(France) Belle Hirondelle; 2 May 1937	(France) unknown	Internal explosion off Palma de Mallorca	Sank in deep waters
(France) Brisbane, 4,004 ton 8 June 1938	(France) André Puech, Paris	Air attack off Denia	Beached, total loss
(France) Cap Bear, 212 ton 15 June 1938	(France) G. Ciamoni, Marseille	Air attack at Valencia	Total loss
Chausser 91; 20 October 1938	Marine Nationale	Air attack at Fornells	Total loss
(France) El Djem, 2,575 ton 30 May 1938	(France) Soc. Maritime Nationale, Paris	Air attack off El Grau, Valencia	Total loss
(France) Francois, 3,457 ton 21 December 1937	(France) Soc. Commerciale d'afrettements et Commissiones, Paris	Surface action - Seized by the Nationalist auxiliary cruiser Mallorca at the Strait of Gibraltar	Confiscated and renamed Castillo Andrade
(France) Gaulois, 500 tons 15 June 1938	(France) Enterprise Cotière des Transports Maritimes, Marseille	Air attack at Valencia	Raised by Nationalist ships on 28 September 1939 and renamed Castillo Turégano
(France) Guaruja, 4,282 ton 2 January 1938	(France) Transports Maritimes, Paris	Grounded at Punta Polacra	Total loss
(France) La Corse, 643 ton 4 November 1938	(France) S.A.R. Louis Carlini, Marseille	Air attack off Cape Matara	Raised by Nationalist ships and renamed Castillo Jarandilla
(France) Liberte; 6 July 1937	(France) La Peche Française, Fecamp	Surface action - Seized by the Nationalist cruiser Almirante Cervera	Confiscated and renamed Castillo Almodóvar
(France) Oued Mellah, 2,414 ton 24 October 1937	(France) Cia. de Navigation Paquet, Marseille	Air attack off Balearic Islands	Sunk in deep waters
(France) Saint Prosper, 4,330 ton 8 March 1939	(France) Soc. Navale de L'Ouest	Hit a mine while bound for Algiers	Sank with all hands
(France) Sydney, 4,937 ton 17 December 1937	(France) Soc. Commerciale d'afrettements et Commissiones, Paris	Surface action - Seized by the Nationalist auxiliary cruiser Lázaro at the Strait of Gibraltar	Confiscated and renamed Castillo Simancas
(France) Tregastel, 1,046 ton 28 September 1938	France Navegation, Paris	Grounded at Cadaqués	Total loss
(France) Yolande, 1,733 ton 26 January 1939	(France) R. Gardellá, Paris	Air attack at Barcelona	Total loss

=== Soviet flag ===
Name and date of loss	Ship's owner	Type of Incident	Aftermath
(Soviet Union) Blagoev, 3,100 ton 3 September 1937	(Soviet Union) Sovietflot	Torpedoed and sunk off Skyros by the Italian submarine Settembrini	Sunk in deep waters
(Soviet Union) Katayama, 3,209 ton 17 October 1938	(Soviet Union) Sovietflot	Surface action - Captured by the Nationalist minelayer Vulcano	Confiscated and renamed Castillo Ampudia
(Soviet Union) Komsomol, 5,109 ton 14 December 1936	(Soviet Union) Sovietflot	Surface action - Shelled and sunk by the Nationalist cruiser Canarias	Sunk in deep waters (Note: Scuttled by its crew per Soviet sources)
(Soviet Union) Lensovet, 4,718 ton 19 March 1938	(Soviet Union) Sovietflot	Surface action - Captured by Nationalist patrol boats at the Strait of Gibraltar	Confiscated and renamed Castillo Bellver
(Soviet Union) Max Hoels, 3,472 ton 2 November 1938	(Soviet Union) Sovietflot	Surface action - Captured by the Nationalist minelayer Vulcano	Confiscated and renamed Castillo Montealegre
(Soviet Union) Potishev, 3,545 ton 31 May 1938	(Soviet Union) Sovietflot	Surface action - Captured by the Nationalist auxiliary cruiser Vicente Puchol	Confiscated and renamed Castillo de Olite (Note: Sunk in March 1939 by Republican coastal batteries at Cartagena during a landing attempt)
(Soviet Union) Skvortzov Stepanov, 2,152 ton 26 May 1938	(Soviet Union) Sovietflot	Surface action - Captured by the Nationalist cruiser Canarias	Confiscated and renamed Castillo Maqueda
(Soviet Union) Smidovich, 2,485 ton 10 January 1937	(Soviet Union) Sovietflot	Surface action - Captured by the Nationalist destroyer Velasco off Bilbao	Confiscated and renamed Castillo Peñafiel
(Soviet Union) Timiryazev, 2,151 ton 31 August 1937	(Soviet Union) Sovietflot	Surface action - Torpedoed and sunk by the Italian destroyer Turbine off Tigzirt	Sunk in deep waters
(Soviet Union) Tsyurupa, 2,081; 23 October 1938	(Soviet Union) Sovietflot	Surface action - Captured by the Nationalist cruiser Almirante Cervera	Confiscated and renamed Castillo Villafranca

=== Greek flag ===
Name and date of loss	Ship's owner	Type of Incident	Aftermath
(Greece) Ellinico Vuono, 3,667 ton 19 May 1938	(Greece) T. Papadimitrou, Pireus	Surface action - Captured by the Nationalist cruiser Canarias near Cape Passero	Confiscated and renamed Castillo Mombeltrán
(Greece) Gardelaki, 2,282 ton 28 March 1937	(Greece) E. Theophilatos, Ithaca	Surface action - Captured by the Nationalist patrol boat Uad Kert on the Strait of Gibraltar	Confiscated and renamed Castillo Tarifa
(Greece) Lena, 1,735 ton 30 March 1938	(France) Jean Milonas, Paris	Torpedoed by a submarine - apparently the Nationalist General Mola	Towed to Barcelona, and sank there in shallow waters. Raised by Nationalist ships and renamed Castillo Moncada
(Greece) Loukia, 2,143 ton 4 March 1937	(Turkey) Mavris & Diacon Zadeh, Istanbul	Hit a mine off Cape San Sebastian	Sank in deep waters
(Greece) Loulis, 330 ton 25 February 1939	(Greece) unknown	Hit a mine off Cap de Creus	Sank in deep waters
(Greece) Nagos, 1,926 ton 5 April 1937	(Greece) J.G. Livanos, Chios	Surface action - Captured by the Nationalist patrol boat Maria Teresa at the Strait of Gibraltar	Confiscated and renamed Castillo Monforte
(Greece) Nicolau Eleni, 4,528 ton 9 November 1938	(Greece) Georgios Nicolau, Pireus	Surface action - Captured by a Nationalist patrol boat at the Strait of Gibraltar	Confiscated and renamed Castillo Madrigal
(Greece) Poli, 2,861 ton 2 April 1937	(Italy) E. Vintiades, Genoa	Surface action - Shelled and sunk by the Nationalist cruiser Baleares	Sunk in deep waters
(Greece) Victoria, 6,600 ton 11 November 1938	(United Kingdom) Georgios Nicolau, London	Surface action - Captured by the Nationalist auxiliary cruiser Mar Cantábrico	Confiscated and renamed Castillo Oropesa

=== Panamanian flag ===
Name and date of loss	Ship's owner	Type of Incident	Aftermath
(Panama) Andra, 1,384 ton 6 April 1937	(Belgium) Socdeco, Antwerp	Surface action - Shelled and sunk by the Nationalist armed trawler Galerna off Santoña	Sunk in deep waters
(Panama) Authorpe, 274 ton 6 January 1939	(France) Marseille Maritime, Marseille	Air attack at Alicante	Raised by Nationalist ships in 1939 and renamed Alhucemas
(Panama) Geo McKnight, 12,442 ton 15 August 1937	(Nazi Germany) Waried Tankschiff (Esso affiliated)	Surface action - Shelled and torpedoed by the Italian destroyer Freccia off Tunis	Ran aground after being abandoned (Note: While some authors assess Geo McKnight as a total loss, she was actually rescued while adrift off Bizerte by tugs of the Italian company Tripcovich, repaired and upgraded at Trieste, and eventually sold to a British company under the name Esso Edinburgh. The tanker served under British flag during World War II)
(Panama) Hordena, 2,667 ton 16 April 1937	(France) Scotia Corp., Paris	Surface action - Captured by Nationalist cruiser Almirante Cervera	Confiscated and renamed Castillo la Mota
(Panama) Janu, 1,347 ton 14 March 1937	(Belgium) Socdeco, Antwerp	Surface action - Captured by the Nationalist patrol boat Huelva	Confiscated and renamed Castillo Arévalo y Tarifa
(Panama) Nausicaa, 5,005 ton 27 May 1938	(Greece) Veniselos, Pireus	Air attack south of Menorca	Sunk in deep waters
(Panama) Reina, 1,436 ton 19 October 1937	(France) Scotia Corp., Paris	Air attack at Gijón	Raised by Nationalist ships on 30 June 1938 renamed Castillo Olmedo
(Panama) Wintonia, 168 ton 30 May 1938	C. Calunietti, Panama City	Surface action - Captured by the Nationalist cruiser squadron	Confiscated and renamed Castillo Rio Seco y Finisterre

=== Danish flag ===
Name and date of loss	Ship's owner	Type of Incident	Aftermath
(Denmark) Bodil, 844 ton 29 July 1938	(Denmark) J. Lauritzen A/S, Copenhagen	Air attack at Palamos	Sunk in deep waters
(Denmark) Edith, 1,566 ton 13 August 1938	(Denmark) J. Lauritzen, Copenhaguen	Air attack off Balearic Islands	Sunk in deep waters
(Denmark) Jan, 1,739 ton 26 May 1938	(Denmark) Holm & Wonsild, Copenhaguen	Surface action - Captured by the Nationalist patrol boat Iñasi	Confiscated and renamed Castillo Coca

=== Norwegian flag ===
Name and date of loss	Ship's owner	Type of Incident	Aftermath
(Norway) Alix, 1,115 ton 30 March 1938	(Norway) A.S. Salvesen, Oslo	Surface action - Captured by the Nationalist patrol boat Huelva off Gibraltar	Grounded and lost off Santoña
(Norway) Gulnes, 1,195 ton 7 December 1936	(Norway) H. Storaas, Bergen	Bombed by Republican aircraft at Seville	Broken up in Vado Ligure, Italy, in May 1937
(Norway) Skottland, 736 ton 1 January 1938	(Norway) A.S. Skottland, Norddbo	Struck a reef off Santander	Total loss
(Norway) Skulda, 1,105 ton 21 July 1938	(Norway) W. Hanseu, Bergen	Surface action - Captured by Nationalist patrol boats at the Strait of Gibraltar	Confiscated and renamed Castillo Daroca

=== Dutch flag ===
Name and date of loss	Ship's owner	Type of Incident	Aftermath
(Netherlands) Hanna, 3,730 ton 11 November 1938	(Netherlands) F.W. Vittenbogaart, Rotterdam	Torpedoed and sunk by the Nationalist submarine General Mola off Cape San Antonio	Sunk in deep waters
(Netherlands) Jonge Jacobus, 1,757 ton 27 January 1937	(Netherlands) Midelansch Zeevart, Rotterdam	Foundered off Berlengas Islands	Sank in deep waters

=== Estonian flag ===
Name and date of loss	Ship's owner	Type of Incident	Aftermath
(Estonia) Juss, 1,187 ton 22 January 1938	unknown	Surface action - Captured by the Nationalist auxiliary cruiser Mallorca at the Strait of Gibraltar	Confiscated and renamed Castillo Gibralfaro
(Estonia) Pomaron, 1,743 ton 21 January 1938	(United Kingdom) Strubin & Co., London	Surface action - Captured by the Nationalist auxiliary cruiser Vicente Puchol at the Strait of Gibraltar	Confiscated and renamed Castillo Butrón

=== German flag ===
Name and date of loss	Ship's owner	Type of Incident	Aftermath
(Nazi Germany) Luise Leonhardt, 4,475 ton 3 January 1938	(Nazi Germany) Leonhardt & Blumberg, Hamburg	Foundered at Melilla	Total loss
(Nazi Germany) Süd IV, 248 ton 12 April 1938	(Nazi Germany) Walfang-Kontor, Hamburg	Stranded at Cape Gando, Gran Canaria	Total loss

=== Belgian flag ===
Name and date of loss	Ship's owner	Type of Incident	Aftermath
(Belgium) Arctic, 147 ton 30 January 1938	(Belgium) Brunet & Co., Ostend	Grounded near A Coruña	Total loss

=== Italian flag ===
Name and date of loss	Ship's owner	Type of Incident	Aftermath
(Italy) Iolanda, 1,243 ton 1 March 1937	(Italy) unknown	Foundered off Cádiz	Sank in deep waters

=== Latvian flag ===
Name and date of loss	Ship's owner	Type of Incident	Aftermath
(Latvia) Everards, 3,075 ton 19 November 1938	(Latvia) F. Grauds, Riga	Surface action - Captured by Nationalist patrol boats off Gibraltar	Confiscated and renamed Castillo Fuensaldaña
