= Italian submarine Aradam =

Italian submarine

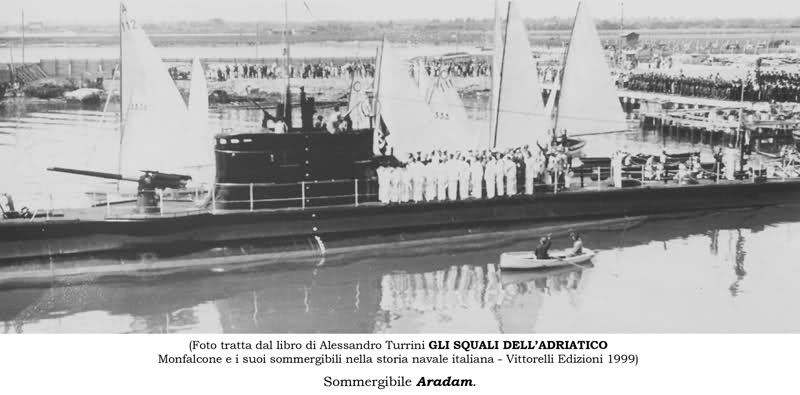
- RIN Aradam

History

Kingdom of Italy
- Name: Aradam
- Namesake: Amba Aradam
- Builder: CRDA, Monfalcone
- Laid down: 14 February 1936
- Launched: 18 October 1936
- Commissioned: 16 January 1937
- Fate: Scuttled September 1943; Refloated by Germany; Sunk by Allied aircraft 4 September 1944

General characteristics
- Class & type: 600-Serie Adua-class submarine
- Displacement: 680 long tons (691 t) surfaced; 844 long tons (858 t) submerged
- Length: 60.18 m (197 ft 5 in)
- Beam: 6.45 m (21 ft 2 in)
- Draught: 4.6 m (15 ft 1 in)
- Propulsion: 2 CRDA diesel engines; 2 CRDA electric engines
- Speed: 14 knots (26 km/h; 16 mph) surfaced; 7.5 knots (13.9 km/h; 8.6 mph) submerged
- Range: 3,180 nmi (5,890 km) at 10.5 kn (19.4 km/h) surfaced; 74 nmi (137 km) at 4 kn (7.4 km/h) submerged; 7.5 nmi (13.9 km) at 7.5 kn (13.9 km/h) submerged
- Test depth: 80 m (260 ft)
- Complement: 44 (4 officers, 40 non-officers and sailors)
- Armament: 1 × 100 mm (4 in) / 47 caliber deck gun; 2 x 1 – 13.2mm Breda machine guns; 6 × 533 mm (21 in) torpedo tubes (4 forward, 2 aft); 12 × torpedoes

Italian submarine Aradam was an Adua-class submarine built in the 1930s, serving in the Regia Marina during World War II. She was named after the Amba Aradam mountain in Ethiopia.

== Design and description ==
The Adua-class submarines were essentially repeats of the preceding Perla class. They displaced 680 long tons (690 t) surfaced and 844 long tons (858 t) submerged. The submarines were 60.18 meters (197 ft 5 in) long, had a beam of 6.45 meters (21 ft 2 in) and a draft of 4.7 meters (15 ft 5 in).

For surface running, the boats were powered by two 600-brake-horsepower (447 kW) diesel engines, each driving one propeller shaft. When submerged each propeller was driven by a 400-horsepower (298 kW) electric motor. They could reach 14 knots (26 km/h; 16 mph) on the surface and 7.5 knots (13.9 km/h; 8.6 mph) underwater. On the surface, the Adua class had a range of 3,180 nautical miles (5,890 km; 3,660 mi) at 10.5 knots (19.4 km/h; 12.1 mph), submerged, they had a range of 74 nmi (137 km; 85 mi) at 4 knots (7.4 km/h; 4.6 mph).

The boats were armed with six internal 53.3 cm (21.0 in) torpedo tubes, four in the bow and two in the stern. They were also armed with one 100 mm (4 in) deck gun for combat on the surface. The light anti-aircraft armament consisted of one or two pairs of 13.2 mm (0.52 in) machine guns.

== Construction and career ==
Aradam was built at the CRDA shipyard, in Monfalcone. She was laid down on 14 February 1936, launched on 18 October of the same year, and commissioned on 16 January 1937. On March 6, 1937, she was assigned to 23rd Submarine Squadron in Naples. During the next three years Aradam conducted several training missions between Tobruk, Benghazi and the Dodecanese.

At the time of Italy's entrance into World War II, she was assigned to the 71st Squadron (VII Submarine Group) based in Cagliari. Her commander at the time was captain Giuseppe Bianchini. On June 10, 1940, she was sent to patrol an area between Sardinia and the island of La Galite. She returned to the base on June 14 without encountering any enemies.

Her second war mission was to attack a French convoy for North Africa in the Gulf of Lion. On June 21 she observed an increased aircraft activity in the area, which indicated an approaching convoy. On June 23 at 3:12 Aradam sighted a fast moving ship in the position 42°40′N 4°25′E, and unsuccessfully attacked her.

In July and August 1940, Aradam carried out two missions off Gibraltar.

In October 1940, she was sent to patrol off La Galite first and then transferred to the area about 60 miles north of Cap de Fer. Then when patrolling 45 miles west of La Galite, On October 27, 1940, she sighted a destroyer and had to dive and move away.

In the afternoon of November 9, 1940 Aradam left Cagliari and to patrol off La Galite along with four other submarines (including Alagi and Axum) as a screen to British Operation "Coat". She returned from this mission without any sightings.

On November 14, 1940, she returned to the sea (together with Diaspro and Alagi) to screen British Operation "White" (transfer of 14 aircraft to Malta from Force-H aircraft carrier).

In January 1941, patrolled 40 miles east of the island of La Galite. In the afternoon of January 9 she detected a ship conducting anti-submarine activity in the area, and moved away.

In April 1941 she patrolled off Cyrenaica and Egypt.

Between the end of July and the beginning of August, Aradam was sent with three other submarines to an area southwest of Sardinia to screen British Operation "Style", but she failed to see any enemy ships.

In September 1941, during British Operation "Halberd" she was deployed together with three other submarines in a defensive ambush to the east of Balearic Islands but British ships did not pass in this area. Aradam then moved further south and in fact on 29 September 1941, sighted a formation of British ships, but she failed to get involved.

In October 1941, she again was on mission sixty miles east of the island of La Galite.

In November 1941, she operated 45 miles northeast of Tunis.

In December 1941, she was deployed off La Galite again.

In January 1942 she was patrolling south of Malta

In February 1942, she patrolled off Algeria, detecting the noises of enemy ships (on February 10), but was unable to locate the convoy.

In March 1942, she patrolled off Cape Bougaroun.

On April 6, 1942, at 03:12 Aradam (under command of captain Oscar Gran), sailing east of Kélibia, sighted a large ship, later identified as HMS Havock, navigating westward in the direction of Cape Bon, and launched a torpedo at 03:17 from about 500 meters in the position 36°47′N 11°05′E.

The seriously damaged destroyer, tried to go towards the coast, but a detonation of her ammunition depot broke her in two, while Aradam observed the events.

According to other sources, HMS Havock stopped at 4:15 in the position 36°48′N 11°08′E, perhaps to avoid the torpedo and was not hit, but was demolished by her crew once they realized the destroyer had run aground and could not be dislodged. According to a third version, Aradam torpedoed and destroyed HMS Havock's wreck.

In May 1942 she operated north of Cape Blanc.

In mid-June 1942 Aradam was sent together with four other submarines, including Ascianghi and Dessiè to patrol off Cape Blanc and later between Malta, Pantelleria and Lampedusa in an attempt to intercept British convoy as part of the Operation "Harpoon". However, the submarine did not sight any enemy ships.

On November 8, 1942 Operation Torch was launched: more than 500 British and American vessels escorted by 350 warships began landing 107,000 troops on the coasts of Algeria and Morocco, thus opening the second front in North Africa. Together with many other Italian and German submarines Aradam was immediately dispatched to the southern Mediterranean. On November 16, 1942 Aradam (under command of Carlo Forni) at night entered the Bay of Bona and found a convoy of three transport with three escorts. She fired two torpedoes, but missed. Then at 5:06 she launched two more torpedoes but missed again. Aradam then shelled the ships with her deck gun hitting and slightly damaging one of the transports before diving to evade the escorts.

From December 1942 through February 1943 she went on several missions patrolling off Cyrenaica.

In March 1943 Aradam patrolled in the Gulf of Sirte.

In May 1943, she patrolled west of Sardinia.

On April 10, 1943, she was at La Maddalena when the base was bombed by 84 US B 24 Liberator aircraft who sunk smaller boats and heavy cruiser Trieste, but Aradam was not hit but had two crew members wounded.

After Italy signed Armistice of Cassibile surrendering to Allies the submarine was undergoing maintenance in Genoa. Aradam was also being converted to an SLC boat. Since she could not leave, her crew scuttled her to avoid capture.

Aradam was refloated by the Germans but repairs were never finished. On September 4, 1944, she was hit by bombs and sank in the port of Genoa during an Allied air attack.
