= SS Skinningrove =

A number of steamships have been named Skinningrove, after the Yorkshire village of that name.

- SS Skinningrove (1891), in service 1891–95
- SS Skinningrove (1895), in service 1895–1919
