= Italian submarine Diaspro =

Italian submarine

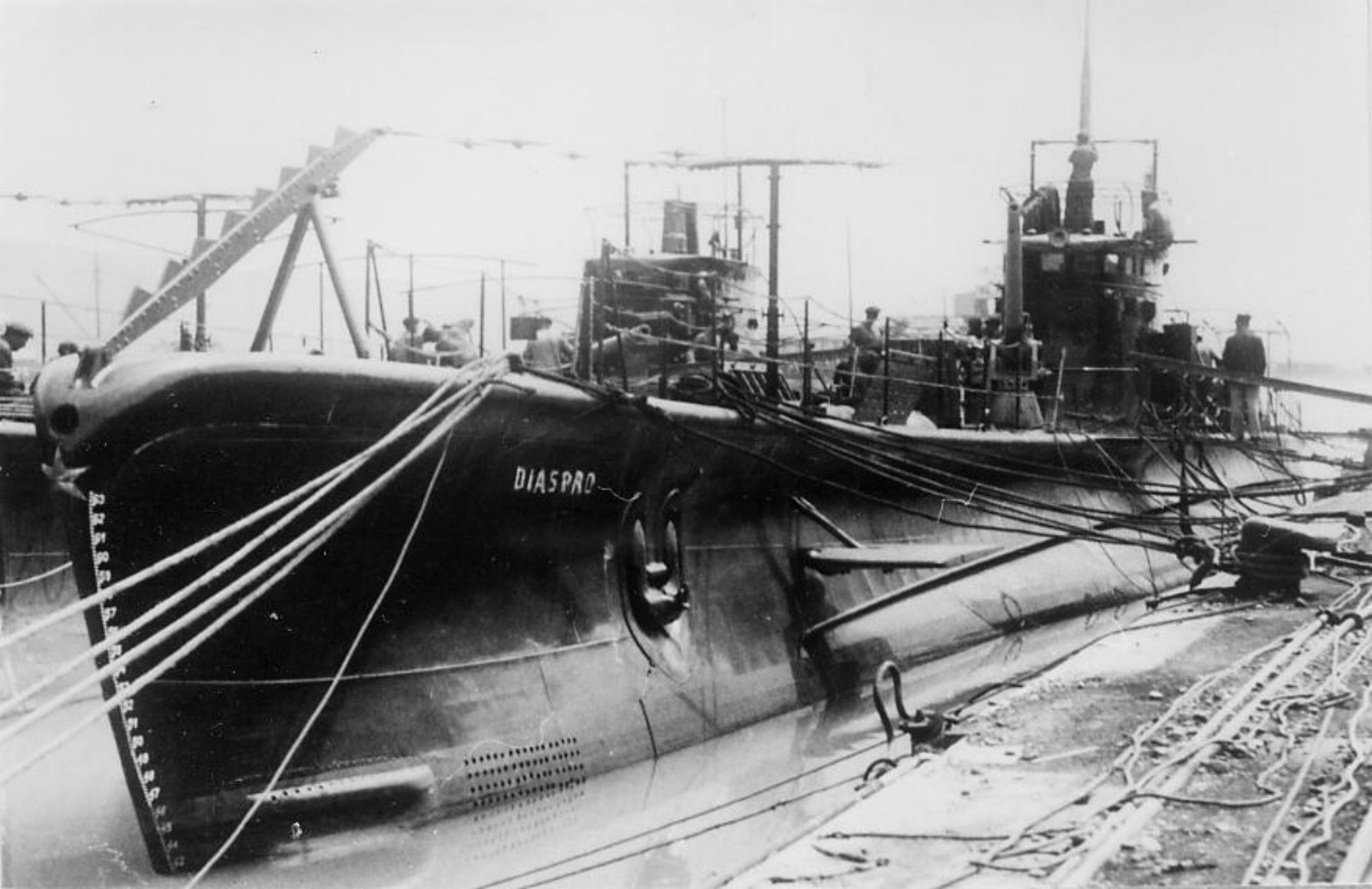
- RIN Diaspro at Monfalcone

History

Kingdom of Italy
- Name: Diaspro
- Namesake: Jasper
- Builder: CRDA, Monfalcone
- Laid down: 29 September 1935
- Launched: 5 July 1936
- Commissioned: 22 August 1936
- Fate: Struck, 1 February 1948

General characteristics
- Class & type: Perla-class submarine
- Displacement: 626.115 tonnes (616 long tons) standard; 700.54 tonnes (689 long tons) normal (surfaced); 859.69 tonnes (846 long tons) normal (submerged)
- Length: 60.18 m (197 ft 5 in)
- Beam: 6.454 m (21 ft 2.1 in)
- Draft: 4.709 m (15 ft 5.4 in)
- Installed power: 1,350 hp (1,010 kW) (diesels); 800 hp (600 kW) (electric motors)
- Propulsion: Diesel-electric; 2 × CRDA diesel engines; 2 × CRDA electric engines
- Speed: 14 knots (26 km/h; 16 mph) surfaced; 7.7 knots (14.3 km/h; 8.9 mph) submerged
- Range: 5,200 nmi (9,600 km; 6,000 mi) at 8 knots (15 km/h; 9.2 mph) surfaced; 74 nmi (137 km; 85 mi) at 4 knots (7.4 km/h; 4.6 mph) submerged
- Test depth: 80 m (260 ft)
- Complement: 44 (4 officers + 40 non-officers and sailors)
- Armament: 6 × 533 mm (21 in) torpedo tubes (4 bow, 2 stern); 1 × 100 mm (4 in) / 47 caliber deck gun; 2 x 1 – 13.2 mm (0.52 in) anti-aircraft guns

Italian submarine Diaspro was a Perla-class submarine built for the Royal Italian Navy (Regia Marina) during the 1930s. She was named after a gemstone Jasper.

== Design and description ==
The Perla-class submarines were essentially repeats of the preceding Sirena class. The modifications that were made compared to the boats of the previous series were mostly of upgrade nature. Among them were enlargement of the false tower at the top, more modern engines, installation of a radiogoniometer that could be controlled from inside the ship. Improvements and the installation of new air conditioning equipment meant a slight increase in displacement, and increase in the fuel stowage also increased the autonomy of these boats compared to the previous series. Their designed full load displacement was 695 metric tons (684 long tons) surfaced and 855 metric tons (841 long tons) submerged, but varied somewhat depending on the boat and the builder. The submarines were 197 feet 6 inches (60.20 m) long, had a beam of 21 feet (6.4 m) and a draft of 15 feet (4.6 m) to 15 feet 5 inches (4.70 m).

For surface running, the boats were powered by two diesel engines, each driving one propeller shaft with overall power of 675–750 hp (503–559 kW). When submerged each propeller was driven by a 400-horsepower (298 kW) electric motor. They could reach 14 knots (26 km/h; 16 mph) on the surface and 7.5 knots (13.9 km/h; 8.6 mph) underwater. On the surface, the Perla class had a range of 5,200 nautical miles (9,600 km; 6,000 mi) at 8 knots (15 km/h; 9.2 mph), submerged, they had a range of 74 nmi (137 km; 85 mi) at 4 knots (7.4 km/h; 4.6 mph).

The boats were armed with six internal 53.3 cm (21.0 in) torpedo tubes, four in the bow and two in the stern. One reload torpedo was carried for each tube, for a total of twelve. They were also armed with one 100 mm (4 in) deck gun for combat on the surface. The light anti-aircraft armament consisted of one or two pairs of 13.2 mm (0.52 in) machine guns.

== Construction and career ==
Diaspro was built by CRDA at their shipyard in Trieste, laid on 29 September 1935, launched on 5 July 1936 and completed on 22 August 1936.

After delivery, Diaspro was assigned to the 35th Squadron (III Submarine Group) based at Messina. After a brief training, she carried out a long endurance cruise in the Mediterranean. During the Spanish Civil War she carried out two special missions under command of captain Giuseppe Mellina. During the first one, Diaspro sailed from Trapani on August 5, 1937, heading to patrol an area north of Cape Bon. During her patrol in the Strait of Sicily along the African coast, Diaspro attempted 25 attack attempts, and on August 13, 1937, launched torpedoes against two ships, one of them probably being the 2,423-gross register ton (GRT) French cargo ship SS Paramé, but missed both times. Diaspro returned to Cagliari on August 15, 1937.

During the second one, Diaspro departed Naples on August 25 to patrol off Cape Oropesa. On September 1, 1937 Diaspro sighted near Benicarló a tanker heading to Alicante. Not being able to catch up with the ship under water, Diaspro attacked the tanker on the surface by launching two torpedoes. The ship crew spotted them, managed to maneuver and avoid them altogether, and made an attempt to ram the submarine. Diaspro fired two more torpedoes which hit the ship in the middle and sank it. The captain of the submarine believed this was a 6987 GRT Republican tanker heading to Alicante under the presumably false name SS Woodford, as the crew appeared to be Romanian. In reality the ship was recently acquired by a British-based operator, and the tanker was carrying petroleum from Constanta to Valencia. Diaspro returned to Naples on September 5, 1937.

At the time of Italy's entrance into World War II Diaspro was assigned to the 72nd Squadron (VII Submarine group) based at Cagliari. Her first mission in Tyrrhenian Sea was uneventful.

In July 1940 she first patrolled northwest of Asinara and then off the island of La Galite.

In August 1940 she patrolled off Cap Bougaroûn.

On September 1, during British Operation "Hats" Diaspro was on patrol in an area between Cape Spartivento and the island of La Galite. She managed to close to within ten miles from the British Force H naval group but could not attack because it was detected and repeatedly attacked by the aircraft of British aircraft carrier Ark Royal and forcing the submarine to dive.

On November 9, 1940, she left Cagliari to patrol off the island of La Galite along with four other submarines with the task of intercepting a British convoy, part of Operation "Coat" but failed to sight any enemy ships.

On November 14, she was deployed along with submarines Alagi and Aradam as a screen to British force part of Operation "White". Located about 315 miles from the island of La Galite, she was only able to detect a minor ship from the British force, but failed to attack it.

On January 21, 1941 Diaspro and Corallo patrolled off the northern Tunisian coast.

Diaspro was on three missions in February, May and June 1941, east of the island of La Galite, about twenty miles north of Cape Blanc, and south of Sardinia, respectively, but without any success.

In the early afternoon of July 21, 1941 Diaspro under command of captain Antonio Dotta sailed from Cagliari to her area of operation about 55 miles off Cape Bougaroun. The next day she arrived at her station and began patrolling on the surface, submerging periodically to obtain a signal on the hydrophones. Finally, around 22:58, after seven hours of search and 45 miles of sailing she managed to close in on a British naval group. Diaspro closed in to within 1,000-1,300 meters and at 23:07 launched four bow torpedoes against cruisers, and two minutes later she fired two stern ones at a battleship and an air-carrier. Destroyer HMAS Nestor detected the first four torpedoes and warned other ships of danger, and the column made a starboard turn, avoiding torpedoes. Two stern torpedoes traveled harmlessly under the destroyer's hull, as they were set to run deeper to hit a larger ship. HMAS Nestor went on to launch depth charge attack against Diaspro, only causing minor damage to the submarine.

Between the end of July and the beginning of August 1941, Diaspro was deployed to patrol an area southwest of Sardinia with three other submarines to intercept a British convoy, part of Operation "Style" but she did not sight any ships. She was then relocated to patrol off the island of La Galite.

In September 1941, she was initially deployed off the island of La Galite. On September 28, she was deployed east of the Balearic Islands, southeast of Menorca as a screen against naval forces of British Operation Halberd however, British ships did not pass in those waters. She then received an order to move south, and in fact, at 6:17 on September 29, she sighted enemy ships about forty miles northwest of Philippeville in the position 37°32′N 6°45′E. Diaspro launched two torpedoes against destroyer HMS Gurkha, who however spotted torpedo wake, and maneuvered away from being hit.

On October 20, 1941, on a mission off Cape Fer, she sighted ships of Force K but could not attack them due to being too far away.

From April 1 to September 10, 1942 Diaspro was assigned to the Submarine School at Pula where she participated in 32 training missions before being reassigned to active duty at Cagliari.

On November 8, 1942 Diaspro was involved in an underwater collision with another Italian submarine Alagi, near Cape Bougaroun, while approaching her patrol sector. Alagi suffered serious damage, while Diaspro had only minor one that did not prevent her from continuing the mission. Four days later the submarine entered Bougie's harbor and from 1,000 meters launched four torpedoes at a transport. The ship dodged all of them by maneuvering. A fifth torpedo was then launched, which exploded but there is no information about any ships being hit at this place and at this time. On November 12, 1942, Alberto Donato was appointed submarine's commander.

In December 1942, she patrolled off Bona, Algeria, entering the harbor on December 14 without achieving any results.

In May 1943 she patrolled west of Sardinia.

In July 1943 Diaspro was on patrol southwest of Sant'Antioco and in the morning of July 13, near Cape Fer, she sighted a large merchant ship accompanied by two corvettes. Diaspro launched four torpedoes, heard two explosions, but apparently no damage was dealt to the ship. Diaspro was then depth charged by one of the corvettes without causing any damage to the submarine. The next day the submarine returned to Cagliari.

On August 18, 1943, off Stromboli she unsuccessfully launched two torpedoes against two British destroyers. Next day, while on her way to Naples, Diaspro intercepted two destroyers and at 23:23 launched four electric torpedoes at them. Approximately one hour after the attack, Diaspro could observe that one of the destroyers was in trouble, sitting dead in water, but she could not repeat the attack as she had run out of torpedoes.

On September 7, 1943, as part of the Zeta Plan, Diaspro was deployed along with ten other submarines in the Tyrrhenian Sea, first in the Gulf of Salerno, then off Gaeta to intercept an anticipated Anglo-American landing in southern Italy. On September 8, 1943 Diaspro was still deployed in the Tyrrhenian Sea when she received an order to cease the hostilities. After the announcement of the Armistice she spent three days at sea, in doubt whether or not to surrender to the Allies in Bona. Captain Donato finally decided to obey the orders, after consulting with the commanders of two other submarines. Diaspro had to go to Cagliari first she had problems with the engines that needed to be repaired.

In March 1944 after the repairs were completed she moved to Taranto where she served in mostly training role for Italian sailors.

On July 17, 1944, under command of Emilio Botta she was sent on a mission to transport and land a group of spies: they were landed in two groups, the first in Zante and the second one in Kefalonia, then Diaspro returned to Brindisi on July 22.

From April to August 1945, she was used for an anti-submarine training of allied ships, while based in Malta.

Disarmed at Taranto at the end of the conflict, she was struck on February 1, 1948, and demolished.

Ships sunk by Diaspro
Date	Ship	Flag	Tonnage	Ship Type	Cargo
1 September 1937	SS Woodford	(United Kingdom)	6,987 GRT	Tanker	Fuel Oil
Total:			6,987 GRT		
