= Cala d'Aiguablava =

Cove and beach in Catalonia, Spain

- Bay and beach
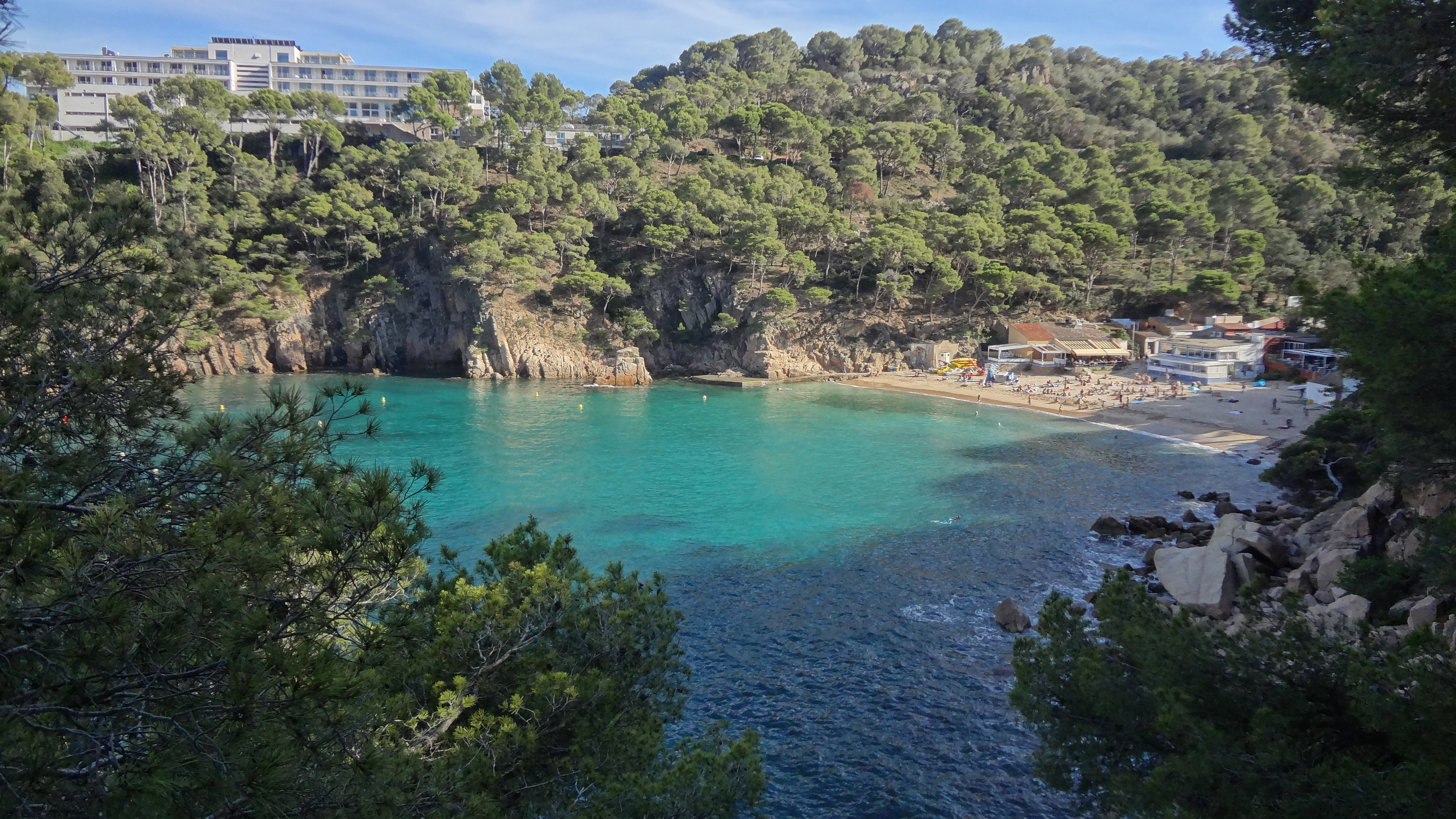
- The beach (right) and parador (left)

- Coordinates: 41.935°N 3.217°E
- Elevation: 0 m

The Cala d'Aiguablava is a small bay on the Costa Brava, Girona, Catalonia (Spain) near Begur and Palafrugell with a small beach (busy in the summer months) and a few mainly seafood restaurants. It is a popular mooring place for sailing and motor boats. Overlooking the bay on one side is a large parador, the Parador De Aiguablava, situated high on a clifftop.

The GR 92 long-distance footpath, which runs the length of the Mediterranean coast of Spain, crosses the beach. To the north the path follows the incised coastline to the village of Fornells, on the other side of the bay, whilst to the south it follows an inland route through pine and cork oak forests to the resort of Tamariu.
