= HMS Southampton (83) =

Town-class cruiser

Coordinates: 34°54′N 18°24′E

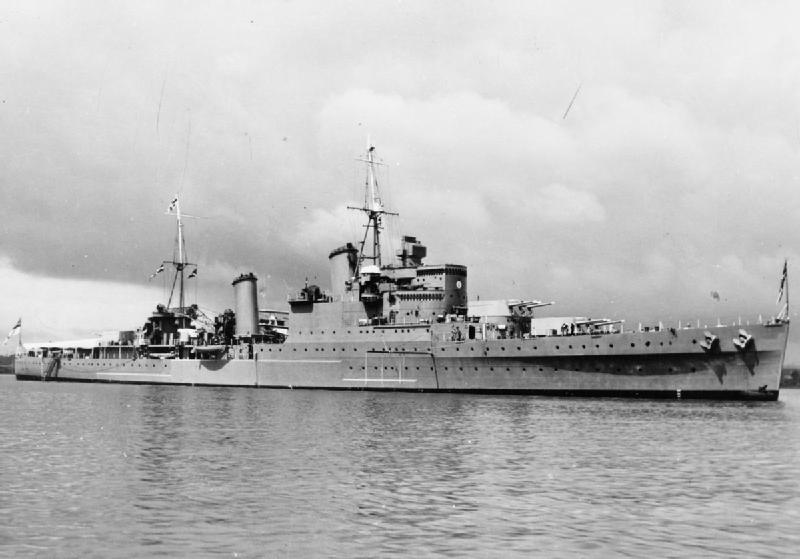
- HMS Southampton in 1937

History

United Kingdom
- Name: HMS Southampton
- Builder: John Brown & Company, Clydebank
- Laid down: 21 November 1934
- Launched: 10 March 1936
- Commissioned: 6 March 1937
- Identification: Pennant number: C83
- Fate: Scuttled off Malta, 11 January 1941

General characteristics
- Class & type: Town-class light cruiser
- Displacement: 9,100 tons standard; 11,350 tons full load
- Length: 591 ft (180 m) overall
- Beam: 61 ft 8 in (18.80 m)
- Draught: 21 ft 6 in (6.55 m)
- Propulsion: Four-shaft Parsons geared turbines; Four Admiralty 3-drum boilers; 75,000 shp
- Speed: 32 knots (59 km/h)
- Complement: 748
- Armament: 12 × BL 6-inch (152 mm) guns [triple mounts]; 8 × QF 4-inch (102 mm) guns [double mounts]; 4 × 3-pounder; 8 x QF 2-pounder (40 mm) AA guns [quadruple mounts]; 6 × 21-inch (533 mm) torpedo tubes

HMS Southampton was a member of the first group of five ships of the Town class of light cruisers. She was built by John Brown & Company, Clydebank, Scotland and launched on 10 March 1936.

== Service history ==
On 20 October 1937, Southampton intervened to release the British steamship Stangrove from arrest by a Spanish Nationalist trawler. Stangrove was carrying 520 refugees from Gijón, Spain to Bordeaux, Gironde, France. The arrest was alleged to have been made outside Spanish territoral waters. Southampton saw service in World War II, and initially served as the flagship of the 2nd Cruiser Squadron with the Home Fleet. On 5 September 1939 she intercepted the German merchant Johannes Molkenbuhr off Stadtlandet, Norway, but her crew scuttled the ship before she could be captured. The crew was taken off by the destroyer Jervis, and Johannes Molkenbuhr was then finished off by destroyer Jersey.

Southampton was later damaged on 16 October 1939 whilst lying at anchor off Rosyth, Scotland, when she was struck by a 500 kg bomb in a German air raid. The bomb was released from only 150 metres (490 ft) height by a Ju 88 of I/KG.30, and hit the corner of the pom-pom magazine, passed through three decks at an angle and exited the hull, detonating in the water. There was minor structural damage and temporary failure of electrical systems. She was repaired and at the end of the year she was one of the ships involved in the hunt for the German battleships Scharnhorst and Gneisenau after the sinking of the armed merchant cruiser Rawalpindi. She then served with the Humber Force until February 1940, and then went to the 18th Cruiser squadron at Scapa Flow. On 9 April 1940, Southampton was operating off the Norwegian coast when she sustained splinter damage in a German air attack. The main battery director was temporarily knocked out. After being repaired, she had anti-invasion duties on the south-coast of England until she returned to Scapa Flow in October.

On 15 November Southampton sailed for the Mediterranean. She participated in the action off Cape Spartivento on 27 November. In December the cruiser was moved to the Red Sea to escort troop convoys, and at the same time took part in the bombardment of Kismayu during the campaign in Italian East Africa. On 1 January 1941 she joined the 3rd Cruiser Squadron and took part in Operation Excess. In the early afternoon of 11 January, both she and fellow cruiser Gloucester came under attack from 12 Stuka dive bombers of II Gruppe, Sturzkampfgeschwader 2, Luftwaffe. She was hit by at least two bombs south-east of Malta and caught fire; the resulting blaze spread from stem to stern and trapped a number of men below decks. 81 men were killed with the survivors being picked up by Gloucester and the destroyer Diamond. Heavily damaged and without power, Southampton was sunk by one torpedo from Gloucester and four from the cruiser Orion.

A week after the sinking Admiral Cunningham, Commander-in-Chief of the Mediterranean Fleet, wrote a private letter to the First Sea Lord, Sir Dudley Pound, "I don't like these 'Southampton' class. They are fine ships but that great hangar structure seems to provide a good point of aim, they are always being hit there." Despite this concern, the other four ships in the Southampton sub-class served through the entire war, and only two of the ten overall Town class ships were lost due to air attack (two others were lost to torpedo attack).
