= Italian submarine Alagi =

Italian submarine

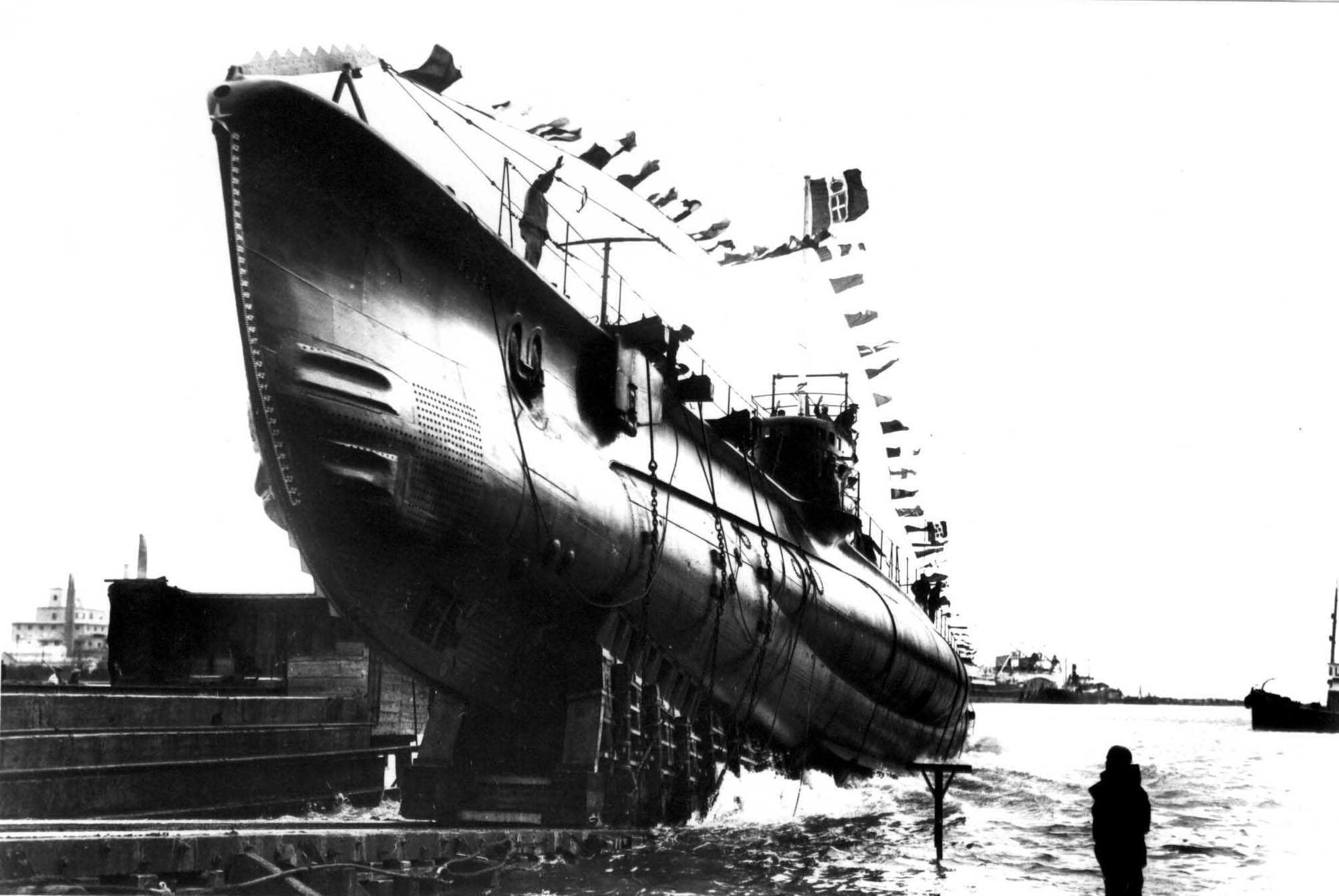
- RIN Alagi launch at Monfalcone

History

Italy
- Name: Alagi
- Namesake: Amba Alagi
- Builder: CRDA, Monfalcone
- Laid down: 19 March 1936
- Launched: 15 November 1936
- Commissioned: 6 March 1937
- Stricken: 23 May 1947
- Fate: Sold for scrap, 1 February 1948

General characteristics
- Class & type: 600-Serie Adua-class submarine
- Displacement: 680 long tons (691 t) surfaced; 844 long tons (858 t) submerged
- Length: 60.18 m (197 ft 5 in)
- Beam: 6.45 m (21 ft 2 in)
- Draught: 4.6 m (15 ft 1 in)
- Propulsion: 2 CRDA diesel engines; 2 CRDA electric engines
- Speed: 14 knots (26 km/h; 16 mph) surfaced; 7.5 knots (13.9 km/h; 8.6 mph) submerged
- Range: 3,180 nmi (5,890 km) at 10.5 kn (19.4 km/h) surfaced; 74 nmi (137 km) at 4 kn (7.4 km/h) submerged; 7.5 nmi (13.9 km) at 7.5 kn (13.9 km/h) submerged
- Test depth: 80 m (262 ft)
- Complement: 44 (4 officers, 40 non-officers and sailors)
- Armament: 1 × 100 mm (4 in) / 47 caliber deck gun; 2 x 1 - 13.2mm Breda machine guns; 6 × 533 mm (21 in) torpedo tubes (4 forward, 2 aft); 12 × torpedoes

Italian submarine Alagi was an Adua-class submarine built in the 1930s serving in the Regia Marina during World War II. She was named after the Amba Alagi mountain in Ethiopia, which was at the time part of Italian East Africa

== Design and description ==
The Adua-class submarines were essentially repeats of the preceding Perla class. They displaced 680 long tons (690 t) surfaced and 844 long tons (858 t) submerged. The submarines were 60.18 meters (197 ft 5 in) long, had a beam of 6.45 meters (21 ft 2 in) and a draft of 4.7 meters (15 ft 5 in).

For surface running, the boats were powered by two 600-brake-horsepower (447 kW) diesel engines, each driving one propeller shaft. When submerged each propeller was driven by a 400-horsepower (298 kW) electric motor. They could reach 14 knots (26 km/h; 16 mph) on the surface and 7.5 knots (13.9 km/h; 8.6 mph) underwater. On the surface, the Adua class had a range of 3,180 nautical miles (5,890 km; 3,660 mi) at 10.5 knots (19.4 km/h; 12.1 mph), submerged, they had a range of 74 nmi (137 km; 85 mi) at 4 knots (7.4 km/h; 4.6 mph).

The boats were armed with six internal 53.3 cm (21.0 in) torpedo tubes, four in the bow and two in the stern. They were also armed with one 100 mm (4 in) deck gun for combat on the surface. The light anti-aircraft armament consisted of one or two pairs of 13.2 mm (0.52 in) machine guns.

== Construction and career ==
Alagi was built in the CRDA shipyard, in Monfalcone. She was laid down on 19 March 1936, launched on 15 November that year and commissioned on 6 March 1937.

On 11 May 1937 Alagi was assigned to the 23rd Squadron based in Naples, from where she conducted training in the Dodecanese. During the Spanish Civil War, between 27 August and 4 September 1937, she carried out a special mission. In 1939 she was reassigned for some time to the base in Cagliari and then to Messina. In 1940 Alagi was assigned to 71st Squadron (V Submarine Group) based at Cagliari.

On 10 June 1940, at the outbreak of hostilities, Alagi was on patrol in the waters off Bizerta. She remained on station until 20 June without sighting any enemy ships.

From 5 to 11 June 1941, Alagi, under command of captain Giulio Contreas, patrolled 20 miles northeast of Ras Azzaz. She sighted a small enemy ship and tried to launch an attack, but it was interrupted by a second ship which detected Alagi and headed in her direction, forcing her to disengage.

At 10:47 on 12 June 1941, while returning to Messina, Alagi was attacked with two bombs and machine guns off Benghazi by a British Sunderland aircraft. The boat's crew responded with anti-aircraft weapons forcing the plane to turn away, probably because it was hit.

On 18 July 1941 she patrolled off of Cap Bougaroûn. On 22 July she detected Force H but was unable to attack it, and was subject to anti-submarine search by escorts.

During August 1941 Alagi patrolled between Sardinia and La Galite Island.

She spent November and December 1941 patrolling off Cape Fer.

In the late afternoon of 14 January 1942, in the Strait of Sicily, Alagi sighted a British naval formation and at 21:05 launched two torpedoes, which did not hit any targets.

On 8 June 1942, roughly 20 nm North of Cape Bon Alagi, under command of captain Sergio Puccini, fired three torpedoes at a naval column (later identified as friendly convoy from Naples to Tripoli). One torpedo hit and sunk the Italian destroyer Antoniotto Usodimare in a friendly fire incident (141 killed and 165 survivors).

On 12 July 1942 at 20:04, at 34°59′N 35°32′E, northwest of Tripoli, Syria, Alagi fired two torpedoes and scored one hit in the engine room of the Turkish tanker Antares (3723 GRT, 1893) on a trip from Iskanderun to Haifa, causing him to be beached on Ruad Island. The tanker was later re-floated, towed to Turkey and scrapped in late 1943.

In August 1942 Alagi operated along the Regia Marina and Luftwaffe to intercept and block an Allied convoy to Malta (Operation Pedestal).

On 12 August 1942 at 21:05, at 37°28′N 10°38′E, Alagi fired a spread of 4 torpedoes against a merchant and a cruiser, and immediately dove. 3 explosions were heard. At 21:12 cruiser HMS Kenya was hit forward by one of four torpedoes and sustained damage to bow structure. HMS Kenya was able to make 25 knots and remained with the convoy to continue operating in defense of merchants. The other 2 torpedoes hit and sunk M/V Clan Ferguson which was previously damaged by a bomb from Ju 88.

On 8 November 1942, while sailing submerged to her area of operation near Bizerta, she collided underwater with another Italian submarine Diaspro and suffered serious damage to her tower and had to turn back and return to Naples.

In December she first patrolled between Cape Bougaroun, island of La Galite and Cape Fer and then from 29 December near Bona, Algeria.

In January 1943 Alagi patrolled northeast of Bona.

From February to June 1943 she conducted several patrols south and southwest of Sardinia.

In July 1943 Alagi first patrolled south of Sardinia, and later provided defensive screen in the waters of Sicily. On 16 July at 6:13, at 37°02′N 15°55′E, she intercepted a column of three destroyers. Alagi launched three torpedoes while on surface. After a minute and 45 seconds a violent explosion was heard, but no information about this action was ever reported in British official documentation.

On 3 September 1943 Alagi was deployed to the Gulf of Salerno, and on 7 September under the Zeta Plan, she was sent along with ten other submarines to the Tyrrhenian Sea, between the Gulf of Gaeta and the Gulf of Paola to intercept an anticipated Anglo-American landing in southern Italy.

On 9 September 1943, following the announcement of the Armistice, Alagi which at that time was about sixty miles from Augusta headed for Malta, where she arrived on 16 September 1943 along with five other submarines escorted by destroyer HMS Isis. Upon arrival she surrender to the Allies. On 13 October 1943 Alagi together with fifteen other submarines left Malta for mainland Italy.

In October 1943, Alagi was transferred to Haifa where she was employed as a training unit for British troops and as a shipping vessel for supplies to the Aegean Islands. She returned to Taranto in December 1944, where she remained inactive until the end of the war. She was sold for scrap on 1 February 1948.
