= SS Mechelin (1895) =

History
- Name: Skinningrove (1895–1919); Hailsham (1919–23); Skinningrove (1923–36); Stangrove (1936–41); Castilla del Oro (1941–44); Condestable (1944–54); Sotileza (1954–55); Mechelin (1955–71)
- Owner: Skinningrove Iron Co. Ltd. (1895–1915); August Reichwald Ltd. (1915–19); John Harrison Ltd. (1919–23); Pease Partners Ltd. (1923–33); Skinningrove Iron Co. Ltd. (1933–36); Stanhope Steamship Co. Ltd. (1936–41); Benjamin Fernandez y Medina (1941–43); Francosco y José María Condeminas (1943–54); Compania Naviera Sotileza SA (1954–71)
- Operator: Owner operated except –; T. C. Hutchinson (1895–1915); R. Hutchinson (1923–33); A. Hutchinson (1933–36); J. A. Billmeir & Co. (1936–41)
- Port of registry: (United Kingdom of Great Britain and Ireland) Middlesbrough, United Kingdom (1895–1919); (United Kingdom of Great Britain and Ireland) London, United Kingdom(1919–23); Middlesbrough, United Kingdom (1923–36); London, United Kingdom (1936–41); Barcelona, Spain (1941–45); (Spain) Barcelona (1945–71)
- Builder: J. L. Thompson & Sons
- Way number: 332
- Launched: 5 June 1895
- Completed: 2 July 1895
- Out of service: 1939–41
- Identification: United Kingdom Official Number 98787 (1895–1941); Code Letters NWDF (1895–1934); Code Letters MQSL (1934–41); Code Letters EAEL (1941–71); IMO number: 5230454 ( –1971)
- Fate: Scrapped

General characteristics
- Type: Cargo ship
- Tonnage: 516 GRT, 165 NRT
- Length: 155 feet 0 inches (47.24 m)
- Beam: 26 feet 8 inches (8.13 m)
- Depth: 11 feet 7 inches (3.53 m)
- Installed power: Triple expansion steam engine, 60nhp
- Propulsion: Single screw propeller

Mechelin was a cargo ship built in 1895 by J. L. Thompson & Sons Ltd., Sunderland, County Durham as Skinningrove. She was renamed Hailsham in 1919, Skinningrove in 1923, and Stangrove in 1936, all under the British flag. After being seized by Nationalist warships in the fading days of the Spanish Civil War, Stangrove was lost to a gale in Palma de Mallorca while in the process of being released. Her wreck was sold to a Spanish company in 1941 and rebuilt as Castillo del Oro. In 1944 the steamer was renamed Condestable. She was renamed Sotileza in 1954 and Mechelin in 1955, serving until 1971, when she was scrapped

== Description ==
Stanningrove was 155 feet 0 inches (47.24 m) long, with a beam of 26 feet 6 inches (8.08 m) and a depth of11 feet 7 inches (3.53 m). She was assesed at 516 GRT, 165 NRT. She was powered by a triple expansion steam engine, which had cylinders of 13 inches (33 cm), 21 inches (53 cm) and 34 inches (86 cm) diameter by 24 inches (61 cm) stroke. The engine was built by J. Dickinson, Sunderland. it was rated at 60nhp.

== History ==
Skinningrove was built as yard number 233 by J L Thompson & Sons Ltd., Sunderland, County Durham, United Kingdom. She was launched on5 June 1896 and completed on 2 July. She was built for the Skinningrove Iron Co. Ltd., Skinningrove, Yorkshire and was operated under the management of T. C. Hutchinson, Middlesbrough, Yorkshire. Her port of registry was Middlesbrough. The United Kingdom Official Number 98787 was allocated. The Code Letters NWDF were allocted. In 1915, Skinningrove was sold to August Reichwald Ltd., Middlesbrough.

On 12 December 1895, Skinningrove was caught in a storm in the North Sea whilst on a voyage from Grangemouth, Stirlingshire to Skinningrove. She put in to the River Tyne for shelter. On 14 January 1896, she collided with the steamship Provencal at Grangemouth. Damage was slight. In February 1897, Skinningrove suffered a fractured main discharge pipe whilst on a voyage from Middlesbrough to Rotterdam, South Holland, Netherlands. She put in to Harwich, Essex for repairs. On 11 April 1899, she lost her propeller off Boulmer, Northumberland. She was taken in tow by a tug. On 25 December 1899, she ran aground on the Beamer Rock, in the Firth of Forth whilst on a voyage from Grangemouth to Skinningrove. She was refloated with the assistance of a tug and was taken in to Grangemouth for drydocking and examination. On 7 December 1900, Skinningrove collided with the barge Interior at Hamburg, Germany. The barge was beached. On 26 October 1903, she lost her propeller whilst on a voyage from Grangemouth to Skinningrove. She was towed in to Leith, Lothian.

In 1919, Skinningrove was sold to John Harrison Ltd, London and was renamed Hailsham. In 1923, Hailsham was sold to Pease Partners Ltd. and renamed Skinningrove. She was operated under the management of R. Hutchinson, Middlesbrough. In 1933, she was sold back to the Skinningrove Iron Co. Ltd., operated under the management of A. Hutchinson, Middlesbrough. She was sold to the Stanhope Steamship Co. Ltd, London in 1936 and was renamed Stangrove. She was operated under the management of J. A. Billmeir & Co. Ltd. With the changes to Code Letters in 1934, Stangrove was allocated MQSL.

On 20 October 1937, Stangrove departed from Gijón, Spain with 520 refugees from the Spanish Civil War aboard. She was arrested by a Spanish Nationalist trawler, but was released when HMS Southampton intervened, claiming that the arrest was outside Spanish territorial waters. The commander of the trawler protested, but Stangrove resumed her voyage to Bordeaux, Gironde, France. On 23 November 1937, she collided with the British steamship Lesrix off Vlissingen, Zeeland, Netherlands whilst on a voyage from Newport, Monmouthshire to Ghent, East Flanders, Belgium. She put in to Antwerp, Belgium. On 3 October 1938, Stangrove was at anchor in Barcelona, Spain when that city was bombed. Her crew observed one aircraft dropping its bombs into the sea before being shot down and crashing in the sea. On 5 February 1939, Stangrove was attacked and captured at sea by the Spanish Nationalist gunboat Dato off Cape Creus whilst on a voyage from Valencia to El Port de la Selva, Spain. She was taken to Barcelona, then Palma de Mallorca under armed escort from the Nationalist auxiliary cruiser Mar Negro. It was 18 February before her owners learnt of the situation. They raised a complaint with the Foreign Office, which led to a change of policy by them. In future, owners of ships would be informed of attacks immediately it became known by the Foreign Office. She was ordered to be released on 24 February, but dragged her anchors and went ashore the night before with the loss of her captain. Her captain had refused to leave the ship. Her crew were taken aboard HMS Devonshire. A surveyor's report found that Stangrove was severely damaged, and that salvage was considered doubtful.

In 1941, Stangrove's wreck was sold to Benjamin Fernandez y Medina, Panama and was renamed Castilla del Oro, though the steamer was granted the use of the Spanish flag by the Minister of Industry and Commerce on 6 June 1941. Her port of registry was Barcelona and the Code Letters EAEL were allocated. In August 1941, Castilla del Oro was sold to Francisco y José María Condeminas, Barcelona, who rebuild the ship and in 1944 was renamed Condestable. In 1954, Condestable was sold to Compania Naviera Sotileza S.A., Barcelona and was renamed Sotileza. She was renamed Mechelin in 1955. With their introduction in the 1960s, Mechelin was allocated the IMO Number 5230454. She was scrapped in 1971 by Desguaces y Salvamentos S.A., Avilés, Spain. Scrapping commenced on 12 July.

== See also ==
- List of foreign ships lost in the Spanish Civil War
