= Fornells de Mar =

Village, bay and port in the municipality of Begur, Catalonia, Spain

- Village, bay and port
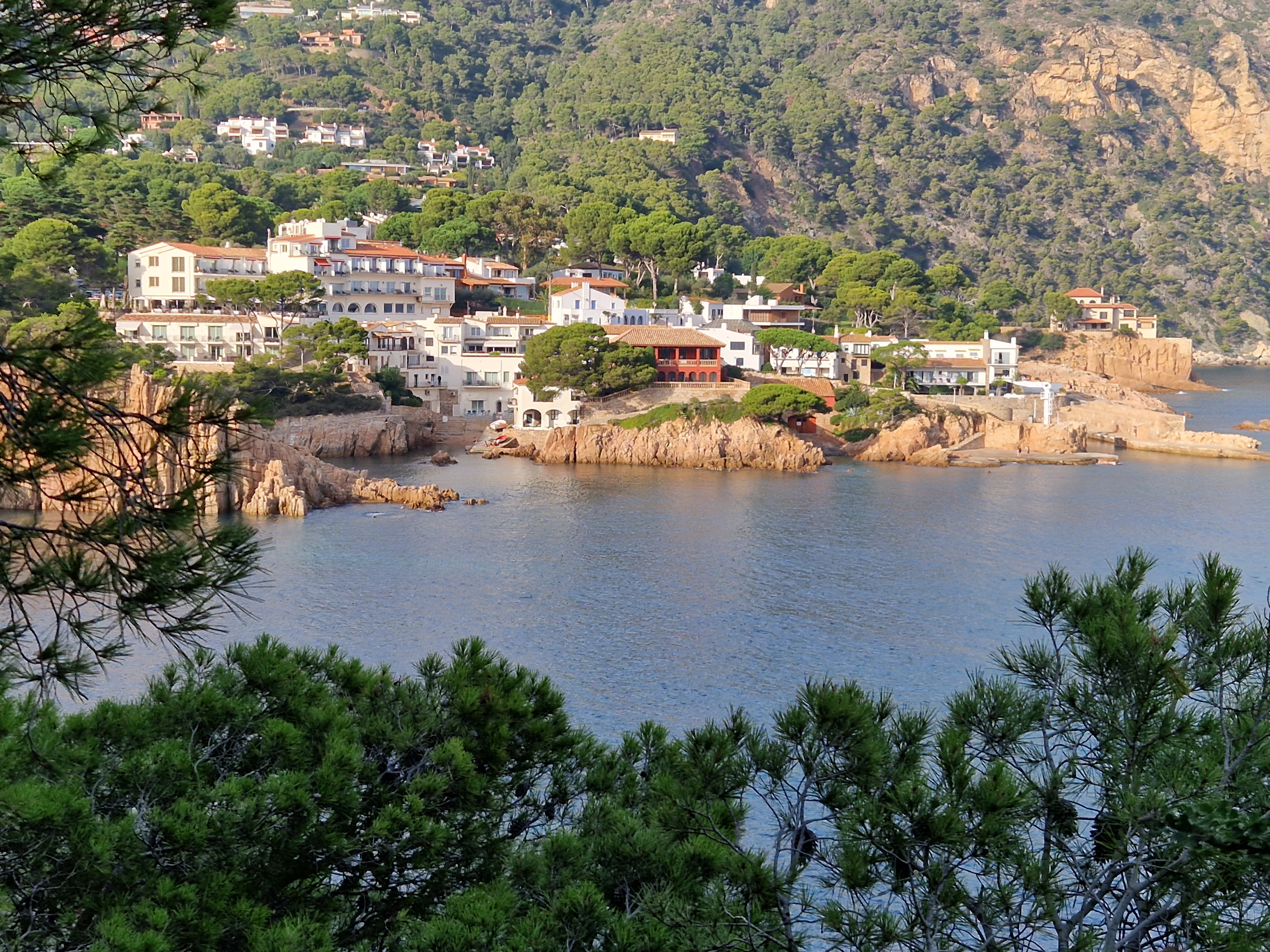
- The village of Fornells viewed across the bay of Aiguablava

- Location within Province of Girona Location within Catalonia Location within Spain
- Coordinates: 41°56′15.36″N 3°12′57.60″E
- Country: Spain
- Autonomous community: Catalonia
- Province: Girona
- Comarca: Baix Empordà
- Municipality: Begur
- Elevation: 0 m (0 ft)

Fornells de Mar (zipcode 17255), also known as Platja de Fornells or simply Fornells, is a village, bay and port on the Costa Brava and in the municipality of Begur, Catalonia, Spain. It lies between Sa Tuna and Tamariu. It was formerly mainly a fishing village and there is still some fishing activity.

Fornells is the site of the Port d'Aiguablava, a marina with 61 moorings operated by the Club Nàutic Aiguablava. Within Fornells itself there are, from north to south, the larger beach of Platja Fonda, and the smaller coves of Cala n’Estasia, Cala Port de ses Orats, Cala d’en Malaret and Cala Port d’Esclanyà. Further to the south lies the beach of Cala d'Aiguablava. There are several hotels in Fornells village, including the large Hotel Aigua Blava.

The GR 92 long-distance footpath, which runs the length of the Mediterranean coast of Spain, passes through the village. To the north the path follows the incised coastline to near Platja Fonda before heading inland towards Sa Tuna and Begur. To the south it follows the coastline to the beach at Aiguablava before following an inland route through pine and cork oak forests to the resort of Tamariu.

The Torras i Arruga family has several luxury estates around the Platja Fonda.

== Gallery ==
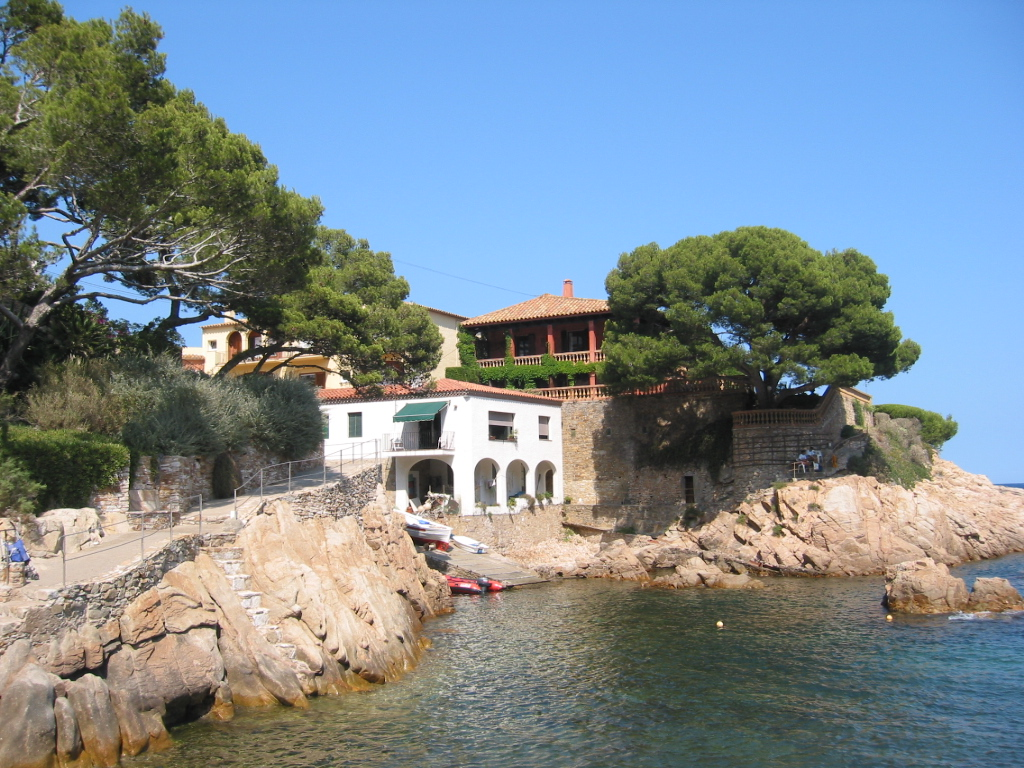
The shoreline

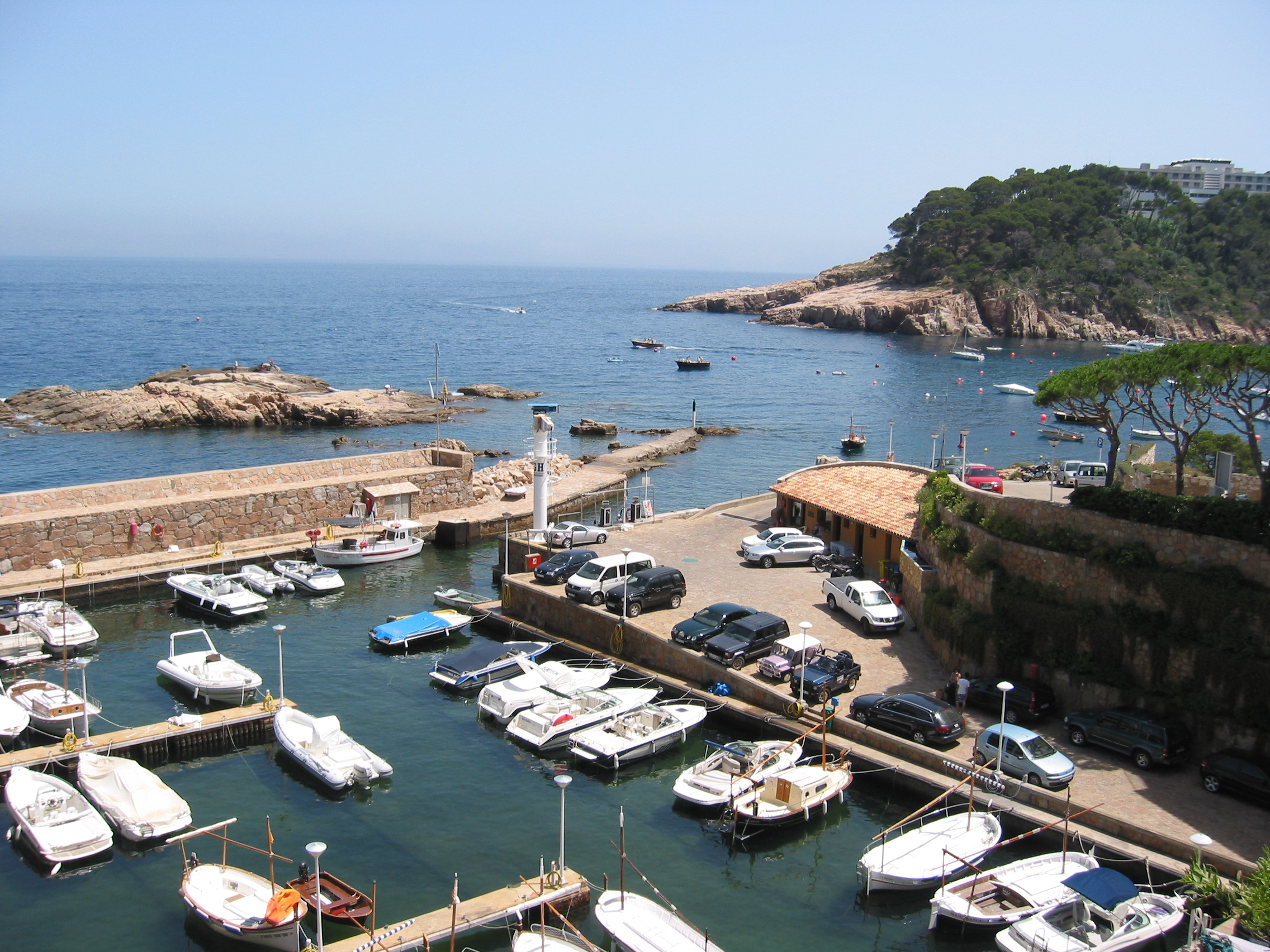
The marina

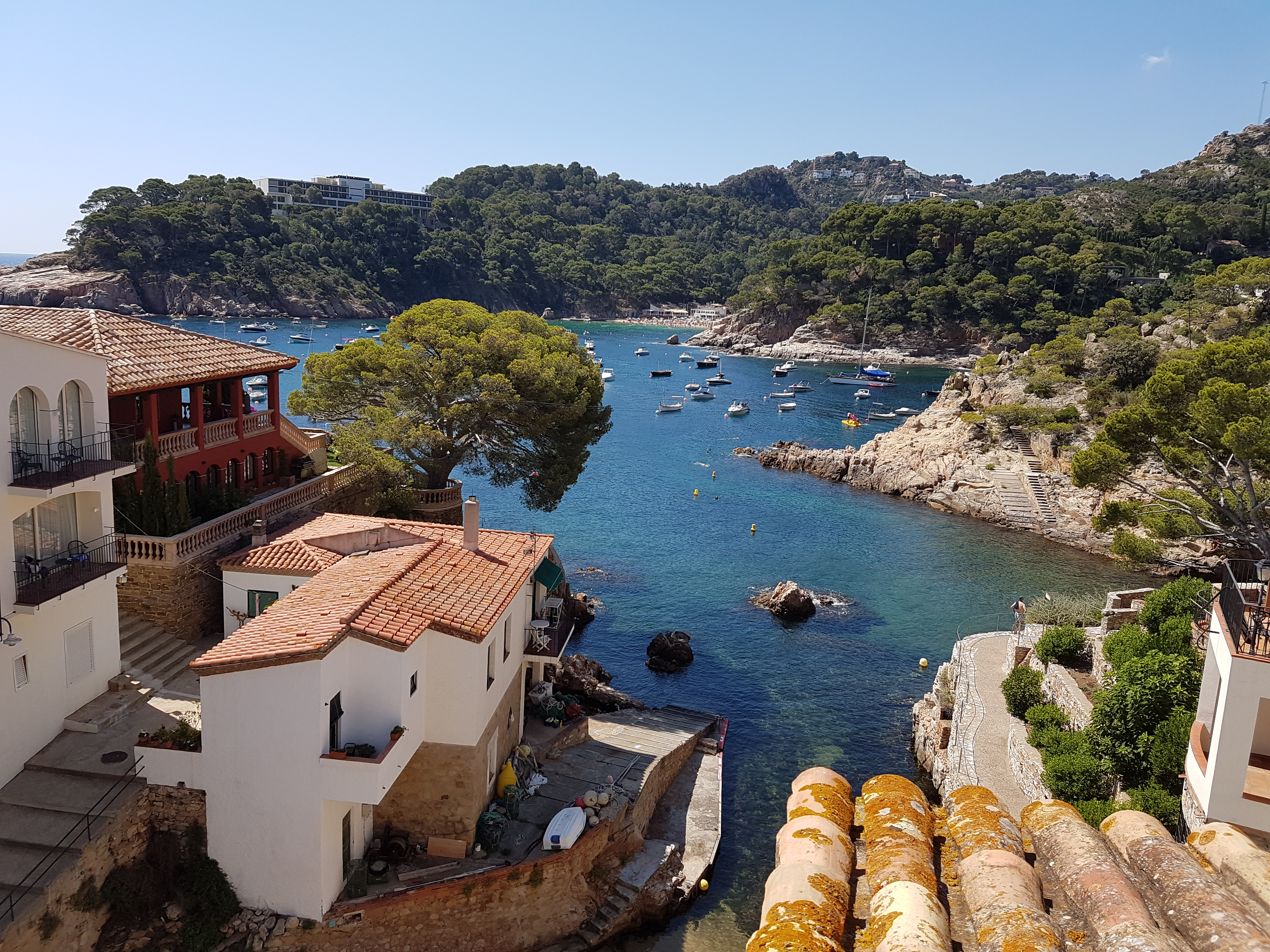
The bay of Aiguablava viewed from the village

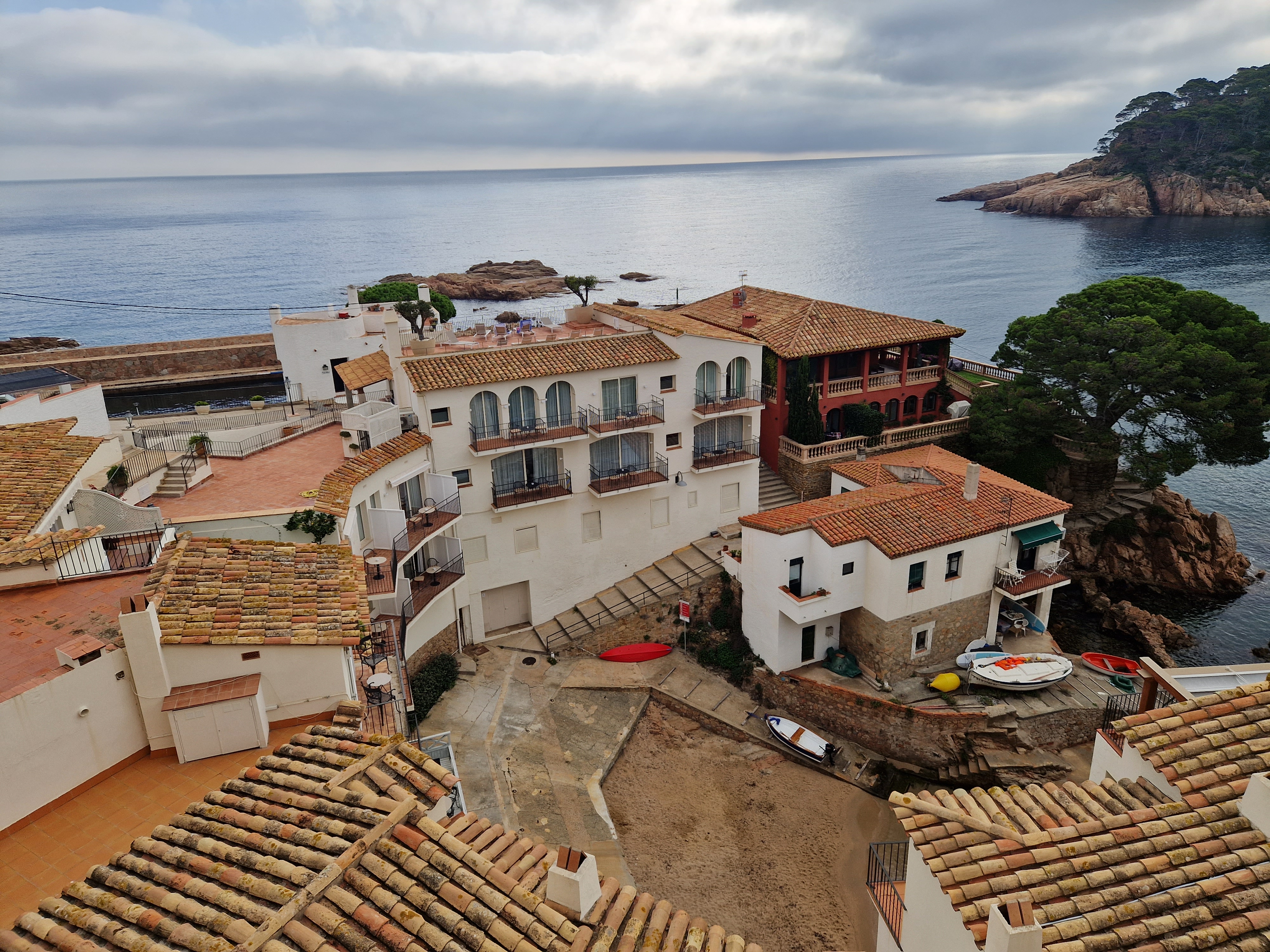
The village viewed from above

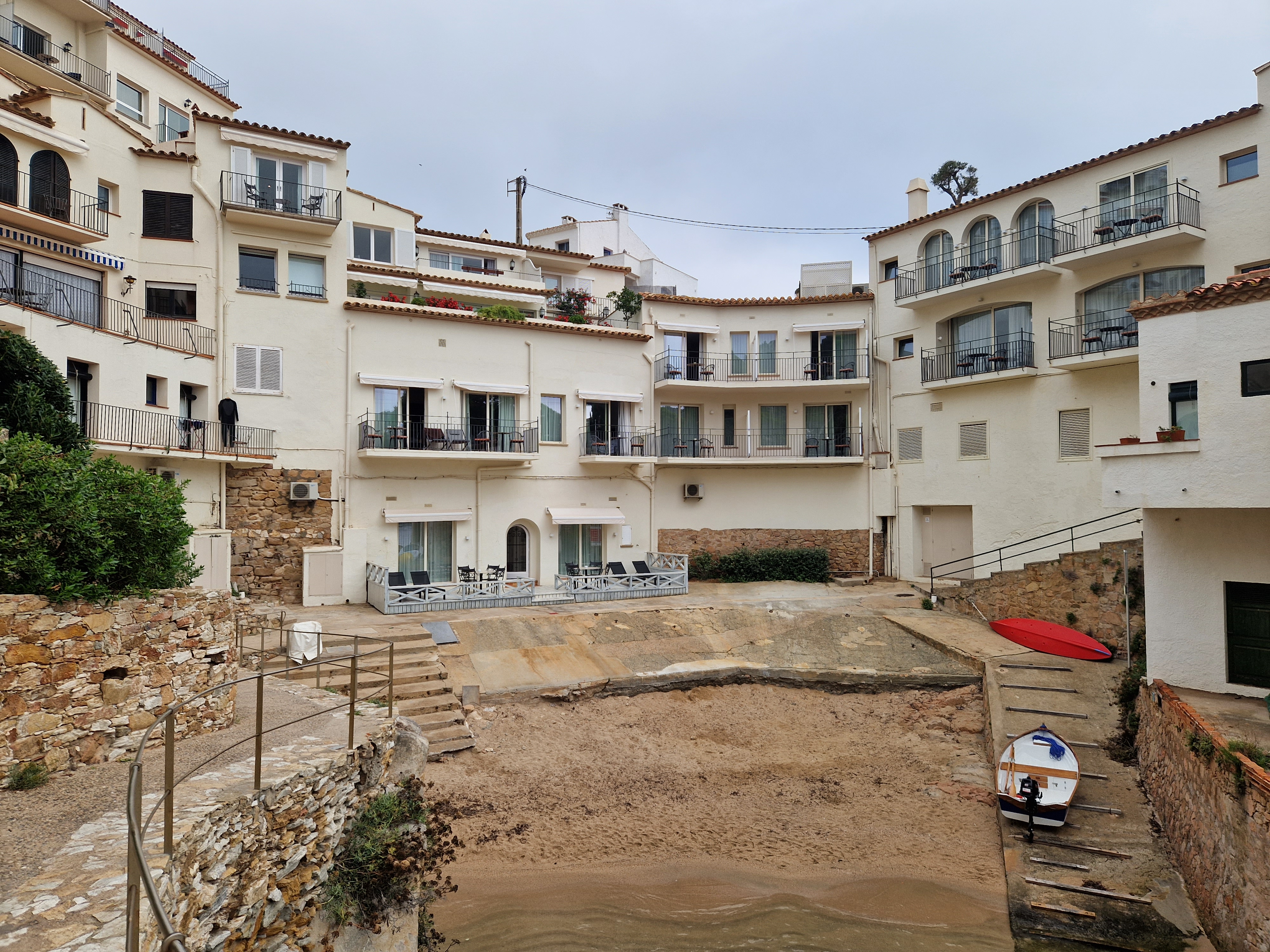
The village beach
