= Júpiter-class minelayer =

- Minelayer Júpiter

Class overview
- Builders: SECN
- Operators: Spanish Navy
- In commission: 1935–1977
- Completed: 4
- Retired: 4

General characteristics
- Type: Minelayer
- Displacement: 2,100 long tons (2,100 t) standard; 2,600 long tons (2,600 t) full load
- Length: 100 m (328 ft 1 in)
- Beam: 12.36 m (40 ft 7 in)
- Draught: 3.6 m (11 ft 10 in)
- Propulsion: 2 shaft Parsons type geared turbines; 2 Yarrow boilers; 5,000 hp (3,700 kW)
- Speed: 18 knots (33 km/h; 21 mph)
- Range: 3,700 nmi (6,900 km) at 12 knots (22 km/h; 14 mph)
- Complement: 180
- Armament: 4 × 120 mm (4.7 in) guns (4×1); 2 × 76 mm anti-aircraft guns; 3 × 20mm; 264 mines or depth charges

Júpiter-class minelayers was a group of four vessels of the Spanish Republican Navy built during the Spanish Republic. Three of them came into service during the Civil War after joining the rebel side.

== Design and construction ==
The minelayers were commissioned by the Government of the Republic to SECN shipyards at Ferrol in 1935, a year before the start of the Spanish Civil War. The construction had been approved by the Cortes on 27 March 1934, after a proposal from the minister of the navy Juan José Rocha García. The warships of the class were designed to protect the Balearic islands in the event of a war between France and Italy.

== Operational history ==
=== Civil War ===
The first three ships of the class were seized by the insurgents and served in the rebel fleet at the very beginning of the war. Their first deployment was the blockade of Bilbao. Due to the lack of destroyers in the Franco's fleet, and the potential of their armament, the main mission of these vessels was not minelaying, but to face Government units in open combat, despite their slow speed.

==== Júpiter ====
Along with Vulcano, Júpiter was one of the main players in the blockade of international shipping in the ports of Biscay, where she took part in the capture of several merchantmen, especially the British Candleston Castle, Dover Abbey and Yorkbrook, the French Cens and a number of Basque Auxiliary Navy trawlers during the second half of 1937. She also laid four minefields off Santander and Gijón, from April to July 1937. The rebel battleship España was lost on 30 April after hitting by accident one of her mines at Santander. There were only four casualties among España's crew.

On 17 July, while on patrol off Gijón, Júpiter caught two British cargo ships while they were attempting to run the blockade. One of them, Sarastone, managed to reach the harbor despite being fired on. The other steamer, Candleston Castle, stopped after the minelayer fired two shots across her bows. She was handed over by Júpiter to the auxiliary cruiser Ciudad de Palma, which escorted the captured merchantman to Ferrol. A fruitless sortie was launched from the French port of Saint Jean de Luz by the Royal Navy battleship HMS Royal Oak and the destroyer HMS Basilisk.

She engaged the Basque Auxiliary Navy destroyer Císcar on 10 August off Gijón. During this exchange of fire, Júpiter's gunfire accidentally straddled the British destroyer HMS Foxhound. Occasionally, she also provided support fire for the rebel troops inland. On 24 August 1937, after the fall of the port of Santoña, Júpiter, along with other naval units was called from Bilbao to watch the British steamer Seven Seas Spray, taken in custody by Nationalist troops while attempting to evacuate Basque troops as part of the ill-fated Santoña Agreement between the Italian Corpo Truppe Volontarie and the Basque Nationalist Party.

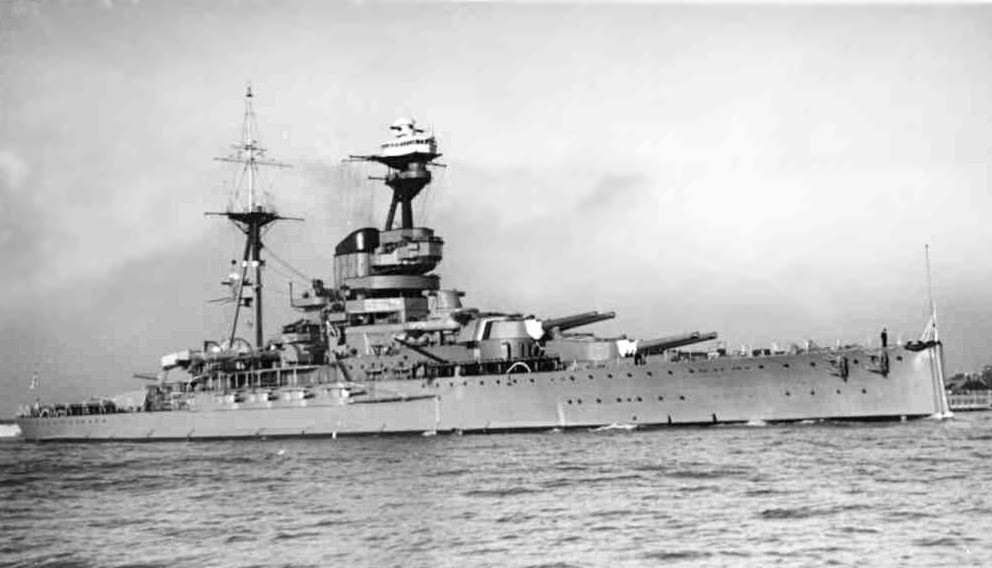
Battleship HMS Resolution

On 5 October, while she was escorting the seized freighters Dover Abbey and Yorkbrook to Ribadeo, the former vessel sent a distress message to HMS Resolution, giving the position and course of the convoy and claiming that her capture had taken place outside territorial waters. Actually, they have been caught by armed trawlers 2 nautical miles (3.7 km) off shore, well inside Spanish maritime boundaries. Júpiter successfully outran the British battleship and the convoy reached destination without incident.

At least five minor vessels carrying refugees and soldiers of the Republican army where seized by the minelayer after the fall of the last government's strongholds on northern Spain by the end of October.

On Christmas Day 1937 Júpiter shelled the port of Burriana, near Castellon, in the Mediterranean coast, where the British freighter Bramhill was at anchor. The merchant was hit by several rounds, specially on her bow, and had to withdraw to Marseille to undergo repairs.

Towards the end of the war, along with the auxiliary cruiser Mar Negro, she supported the landing of an infantry division on Mahón, Menorca, after the Republican surrender of this island, on 9 February 1939. She was one of the units involved in the blockade of Alicante, where thousands of refugees gathered in order to flee Spain when Franco's victory was in sight. Assisted by her sister ships, Júpiter entered the port on 31 March, the day before the official end of the conflict, in order to land the 121st and 122nd Galician Regiments.

After the Spanish Civil War, in December 1940, Júpiter carried out an undercover reconnaissance mission around Gibraltar with Admiral Canaris, General Lang and a Spanish officer aboard. The goal was to gather intelligence about the British fortifications and boom defenses as a first step toward the proposed Operation Felix.

==== Vulcano ====
Minelayer Vulcano during World War II, displaying neutrality marks on her bow

Vulcano temporarily blocked the entrance to Gijón of the British merchants Stanray and Stangrove. At the end of the war in the north she joined a naval squadron which drove back the steamers Hillfern, Bramhill, Stanhill and Stanleigh off Cape Peñas, seizing a number of small Republican vessels crowded with refugees in the process. During this period she shelled, without success, the British Thorpebay when this steamer entered the port of the Musel. Between the last months of 1937 and 1939 Vulcano was active in the Mediterranean, where she was part of the rebel fleet which bombarded Castellon, Burriana and Vinaròs on Christmas Day 1937. She played a key role, along with her sisters ships, in ferrying troops after Franco's army reach the coast between Valencia and Barcelona in April 1938.

On 17 October 1938, she seized the Soviet cargo ship Katayama, of 3,200 tons. She also played a secondary role in the capture of the Greek merchant Victoria by the auxiliary cruiser Mar Cantábrico and the British Stangrove by the gunboat Dato, in the final months of the civil war. All these freighters joined the Spanish merchant fleet at the end of the conflict.

Perhaps the most famous action of Vulcano is the chase and capture of the Republican Churruca-class destroyer José Luis Díez off Gibraltar, in the course of a battle fought as close as 50 metres (160 ft) between the ships involved. José Luis Diez eventually became stranded in Catalan Bay, in the territory of Gibraltar, the last day of 1938. The destroyer was turned over to Franco's government after its recognition by Britain as the legitimate authority in Spain.

She was the leading unit of an aborted landing at Cartagena on 7 March 1939, after the withdrawal of the Republican fleet from its bases and its internment at Bizerte. The operation was mounted on the belief that anti-communist Republicans had taken over the port once the Government navy fled. However, loyalist forces retook control of the coastal batteries around the harbour. All the ships received the order of aborting the operation, but two transports, Castillo de Olite and Castillo Peñafiel, deprived of radio, continued toward Cartagena undeterred. They were the former Soviet steamers Postishev and Smidovich, of 3,545 and 2,485 tons respectively, which had been seized by the Nationalists at high seas. Castillo de Olite was sunk by a 381 mm (15 in) battery close to the docks, with a loss of life of almost 1,500. Meanwhile, Castillo Peñafiel had a narrow escape, harassed by Republican aircraft. In a letter to General Franco, Admiral Francisco Moreno put the blame on Vulcano's commander for his failure to prevent the departure of the freighters, as ordered by Moreno himself. Vulcano apparently gave a green light to the transports after receiving contradicting orders from the high command to proceed.

Along with her sister ships, Vulcano landed two infantry battalions at Alicante on 31 March, the day before the official end of hostilities.

==== Marte ====
Marte was the last minelayer of the class to be commissioned before the end of the civil war. Neptuno, the last of the batch, was not completed until November 1939, seven months after the war was over. Marte was released to the Nationalist navy on 11 November 1938. The minelayer departed from El Ferrol in December 1938 to take part in the chase of the Republican destroyer José Luis Díez, which had taken shelter in Gibraltar. Given the inexperience of her crew, Marte didn't play any major role in the neutralization of the Republican warship. Later, in January 1939, while based at the port of Palma, Marte participated in gunnery trials off Mallorca and in blockade activities along the Catalan coast and the Gulf of Lion. In February, she relieved her sister Júpiter from her blockade duties off Catalonia, and on 21 February she attended a naval parade at Salou. On 7 March 1939, during the ill-fated landing on Cartagena, Marte loaded troops and cargo at Castellon before the operation was cancelled. Along with her sisters, she patrolled the Republican waters off Alicante in the waning days of the war. Marte took part in one of the last international maritime incidents of the war on 19 March 1939, when she prevented the British steamer Stanbrook from entering Alicante. The ship, chartered by the Republican government, went back to Oran, Algeria. The Stanbrook eventually reached the Spanish port on 27 March, after the Nationalist side displayed some indulgency toward the evacuation of refugees in return for the British recognition of Franco's legitimacy. Two days later, Stanbrook left Alicante bound for Oran, crowded with at least 2,000 people, one of the last ships to either enter or flee Republican Spain. Her Welsh skipper, Captain Archibald Dickson, later killed during the sinking of his ship in World War II, is today remembered as a hero in Alicante.

=== Refurbishment ===
Of the four vessels, only Júpiter and Vulcano took part in a modernization program after the agreements between Spain and the United States in the 1950s, and were reclassified as frigates. The modernization was held in Cartagena from 1958 to 1961. The antisubmarine and antiaircraft weapons were updated by adding a squid multiple mortar and Bofors 40 mm guns. The units were also fitted with radar. Both ships joined the frigate squadron along with those units of the first Pizarro class. Júpiter was written off the Navy List on 23 November 1974, and Vulcano was used as a store ship from 12 March 1977 until her final decommissioning on 30 April 1978, this being the last warship to be removed from service of those who participated in the Civil War.

Marte and Neptuno remained unchanged until their decommissioning in 1971 and 1972 respectively.

== Units of the class ==
Name	Number	Commissioned	Scrapped
Marte	F-01	1938	1971
Neptuno	F-02	1939	1972
Júpiter	F-11	1937	1974
Vulcano	F-12	1937	1977
