= MV Mar Negro =

- MV Mar Negro

History

Spain
- Name: Mar Negro
- Namesake: Black Sea
- Owner: Compañía Marítima Del Nervión
- Builder: Euskalduna of Bilbao
- Launched: 1930
- Fate: Requisitioned by the Republican Navy in 1936, later defected to the Nationalist faction in 1937

Nationalist Spain
- Name: Mar Negro
- Operator: Spanish Nationalist Navy
- Builder: SECN, Bilbao
- Acquired: September 1937
- Commissioned: 20 May 1938
- Out of service: 19 October 1939
- Reclassified: Auxiliary cruiser, 1937
- Fate: Returned to original owner in 1939, later sold to various owners, scrapped in 1973

General characteristics
- Displacement: 6,632 tn
- Length: 123.39 m (404.8 ft)
- Beam: 16.61 m (54.5 ft)
- Draught: 7.8 m (26 ft)
- Propulsion: 2 x 6-cyl diesel engines; 7,600 hp (5,670 kW)
- Speed: 15 knots (28 km/h)
- Range: 60,000 nmi (110,000 km) at 10 knots (19 km/h)
- Armament: As auxiliary cruiser; 4 × 152 mm (6.0 in) Mk XII naval gun; 4 × 88 mm (3.5 in) Flak 18 AA gun; 4 × 47 mm (1.9 in) Armstrong AA gun; 3 × 20 mm (0.79 in) Scotti AA gun; 3 × depth charge launchers

Mar Negro was an armed merchantman of the Nationalist Spanish Navy during the Spanish Civil War. The cargo ship was launched in 1930 along with her sister ship MV Mar Cantábrico, and after five years with the Compañía Marítima Del Nervión company, she was requisitioned by the Spanish Republican Navy in 1936. Captured by a group of Nationalist sympathizers from her crew off Algeria in 1937, she entered in service in 1938 after being converted to an auxiliary cruiser.

== Civilian career ==
Mar Negro was built in 1930 along with her sister ship by the Spanish shipbuilder company Eskalduna at Bilbao. She was a 6,632-ton motor vessel and was part of a series of four ships of different tonnage. Two of them were 4,700-ton steamers (Mar Blanco and Mar Caribe), while Mar Negro and Mar Cantábrico were propelled by two diesel engines. The merchantmen were owned by the Compañía Marítima del Nervión, based at Bilbao. The cargo vessels were engaged in trade between Spain and United States ports at the Gulf of Mexico. Both of them ended up as auxiliary cruisers of the Nationalist navy.

== Under Republican flag ==
At the beginning of the war in 1936, Mar Negro was moored at Barcelona, a city which remained under the control of the Government. She was fitted out as a troop transport, and was one of the Republican ships which took part of the abortive landing on Mallorca in August 1936. Months later, she became involved in the maritime traffic between the Soviet Union and the Spanish Republic, and survived the attack of an Italian submarine.

== Career as Nationalist auxiliary cruiser ==
In September 1937, the ship, bound to Barcelona from Odessa, was diverted by her captain and part of the crew towards Cagliari, Sardinia, where the Nationalists had an improvised naval base with the support of Fascist Italy. After seeing some activity as a supply ship, Mar Negro was converted into a naval unit at the same shipyard where she and her sister had been built, the SECN facilities on the Nervion River, near Bilbao. She was equipped with four 152 mm Vickers main guns, four 88 mm, four 47 mm Armstrong, three 20 mm Scotti and three depth-charge launchers.

Completed in May 1938, the auxiliary cruiser joined the maritime blockade on Republican ports in the Mediterranean. Between 19 and 22 December 1938, Mar Negro seized three Greek steamers in short succession near the channel of Sicily; the tanker Atlas, and the freighters Aris and Oropus, without opposition of non-intervention forces. On 28 January 1939, the Nationalist cruiser shelled Palamós, one of the last Republican-held ports in Catalonia, scoring several hits on a British freighter and damaging some shore facilities. Mar Negro was fired on by an enemy 155 mm coastal gun during this action. Spanish Republican sources say that the only British steamer at Palamós at the time was the largely disabled Lake Lugano, damaged by a flying boat attack on 6 August 1938 and later beached outside the docks. The complement, with the exception of his captain, had abandoned the ship after a second airstrike on 9 August 1938. She endured further bombings from German and Italian aircraft, and after the naval shelling of 28 January the vessel became a wreck. A local report says that the naval bombardment was carried out by the heavy cruiser Canarias.

She landed the 105 Infantry division on Mahón, Menorca, after the Republican surrender of this island, on 9 February 1939, with the support of the minelayer Júpiter.

After the fall of Catalonia, the cruiser led a naval parade off Tarragona with General Franco aboard on 22 February 1939.

Mar Negro took part of the aborted landing on Cartagena on 6 March, when she assisted her sister ship Mar Cantábrico in the rescue of a German flying boat damaged by Republican aircraft and the capture of an armed tug.

=== End of the war ===
On 8 March 1939, Franco's government decreed a ban on shipping around three miles from the coast of Levante, between the ports of Adra and Sagunto. After objections from the British government, the Nationalists soften this declaration by replacing the word "ban" for "restrictions" to shipping. Admiral Moreno, commander in chief of the Nationalist fleet, also played down the scale of the operation during a private meeting with the British consul at Palma de Mallorca. Indeed, the Nationalist deployment was reduced to submarine patrols around Cartagena and the presence of an auxiliary cruiser and a destroyer off Valencia. In the latter case, there was a rotation between the auxiliary cruiser Mar Cantábrico and Mar Negro and the old destroyers Ceuta and Melilla.

==== Incident with HMS Sussex ====
On 16 March 1939, two incidents between Mar Negro and the British heavy cruiser HMS Sussex took place off Valencia, with the result of a British steamer captured and another damaged. The Spanish auxiliary cruiser also suffered some scratches on her stern in the aftermath.

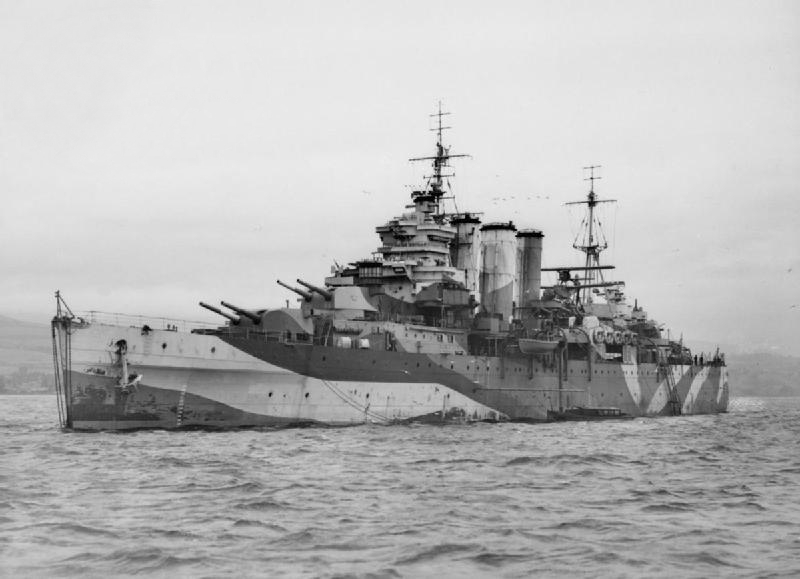
Heavy cruiser HMS Sussex

Mar Negro and the Italian-built World War I destroyer Melilla were enforcing the blockade outside Valencia's port. Shortly before the departure of Melilla back to Palma for refueling, they spotted a cargo ship steaming for Valencia. She was the British freighter Stangate, of 1,289 tons. At 10:00 AM, while clearing for action, the cruiser's commander warned the vessel that she will be fired on if she entered Spanish waters. Apparently ignoring the threat, Stangate was within the three-mile limit by 10:30. The vessel was maneuvering near the beach of Saler, where the Republicans had mounted a 381 mm battery, which kept silent during the incident. Then Mar Negro's commander ordered the merchantman to stop, but her captain steered to the east, toward international waters. Stangate eventually came to a stop outside the three miles, approximately at 39°22′36″N 0°15′17″W. At the same time, the British cruiser HMS Sussex appeared on scene. Mar Negro's commander reacted quickly: a prize crew of 13 men was dispatched by boat to board the British cargo ship, after the auxiliary cruiser got close to Stangate. The merchant was then taken under control by the Nationalist warship. Sussex's commander requested an explanation regarding the position of Stangate at the time of her capture, and sent a party on board the British vessel. The officer in charge of the party, after realising that the ship was now crewed by the Spaniards, communicated the news to his superior, who eventually conceded the capture. Stangate was then sailed to Palma by the prize crew at 2:00 pm. During the evening of that day, while on patrol off Sagunto, Mar Negro spotted another British steamer, Stanhope, just outside territorial waters. Nevertheless, Mar Negro ordered the ship to stop, on the basis that the merchant had departed from Valencia, thus breaching the restrictions on shipping around the three mile zone. The captain of the merchantman refused to submit, and made a distress call to HMS Sussex. A stand-off ensued, which ended abruptly at 8:30 pm when the British cargo ship, according to the Spanish version, attempted to ram Mar Negro. The Nationalist warship maneuvered to port to avoid the collision, but the port bow of the merchant bounced her port quarter off. The incident resulted in some damaged on both ships. All units involved fled the scene afterwards, Stanhope with the help of HMS Sussex.

Mar Negro was also mentioned in the House of Commons on 20 March 1939 in connection with the confinement of seven British subjects on board the cruiser. They were members of the crew of the small British steamer Stangrove, of 550 tons. The vessel had been captured in February off Cap de Creus by the Nationalist gunboat Dato, which was patrolling Catalonia's coast from Palamós to the French border assisted by the minelayer Vulcano. Stangrove was sent first to Barcelona and then to Palma, where she was lost under suspicious circumstances, wrecked by a gale. Her master, Captain William Richards, died in the incident. The ship was saved by the Spanish right after the war, and subsequently renamed Castilla del Oro and later Condestable. Stangate was the last merchantman captured on the high seas during the Spanish Civil War. The cargo ship and her crew were held by the Spanish authorities several weeks after the end of the war at Palma, where she remained under the supervision of the British consul until her release.

==== Fall of Gandía ====
On 25 March 1939, Mar Negro rotated duties with her sister ship Mar Cantábrico as usual. Meanwhile, on the political front, secret negotiations between Franco and Colonel Casado, a Republican leader who had formed the National Defence Council to replace the government after a coup against the communist party, were going on. These talks included the mediation of the British consul at Valencia, Mr. Godden. Franco gave unwritten assurances that he will not ordered the occupation of Madrid to his army before the main Republican anti-communist leader came to exile. The agreement also implied the evacuation by sea of a large number of Republican sympathizers from the port of Gandia, south of Valencia. The British manager of this port, a Mr. Apfel, was a key figure in the rescue of refugees, who were taken a board the British cruisers HMS Galatea and HMS Sussex, as well as the hospital ship RFA Maine and several freighters. Conversely, the deal allowed the repatriation of Italian prisoners still held by the Republicans in British ships bounded for Palma. Indeed, just hours before her replacement by Mar Negro, Mar Cantábrico stopped and searched the London-registered steamer Stanland, but following orders from the Nationalist high command the auxiliary cruiser allowed her to proceed to Valencia.

On 26 March there were three minor incidents with units of the French Navy, and on the 27 the cruiser successfully protected a Nationalist flying boat which was being chased by the still active Republican air force. The enemy aircraft were forced to disengage by the 88 mm guns of Mar Negro. On 29 March, the cruiser headed for Gandía, where the evacuation sanctioned by Franco was taking place. After the last refugee was on board the British vessels, a party of 22 men, led by the 2º commander of Mar Negro landed in a boat. They took control of the port and the hulls of the Spanish steamer Vicente, of 534 tons, the British Dellwyn of 1,420 and a dredger, all of them sunk in shallow waters by earlier air attacks. The cargo ships were later raised and put in service under Spanish Nationalist flag, Dellwyn under the name Castillo Montesa. Before returning to Gandía and get some time to rest, the auxiliary cruiser made a full reconnaissance of the small ports of Denia and Jávea. On 31 March they informed to the British consul, after a request by the commander of HMS Galatea, that all Spanish ports were open to British shipping. Mar Negro eventually returned to civilian service in October 1939, seven months after the war was over.

== Last years ==
After being handed back to her original owners, Mar Negro operated on the route between Spain and North American ports until 11 September 1962, when the ship was partially destroyed by an accidental fire at Port Arthur, Texas. Rebuilt in 1968 as Rio Pisueña and successively sold to several Spanish companies from Bilbao, she ended her days owned by the Mexican Navimex S.A. as Rio Frio. Her hull was eventually scrapped at Kaohsiung, Taiwan, on 5 January 1973.

== See also ==
- List of foreign ships wrecked or lost in the Spanish Civil War
