= SS San Joaquin =

History

Norway;Greece
- Name: San Joaquin (1913-1929); Melville (1929-1935); Iolcos (1935-1937); Woodford (1937)
- Owner: A/S Tankfart (1913-1929); A/S Hektor (1929-1935); Hellenic Tramp S.S. Co (1935-1937); Finchley S.S. Co (1937)
- Operator: A/S Tankfart (1913-1929); A/S Hektor (1929-1935); Hellenic Tramp S.S. Co (1935-1937)
- Builder: Sir James Laing & Sons Ltd
- Yard number: 644
- Launched: November 14, 1913
- Christened: San Joaquin
- Commissioned: December 20, 1913
- Homeport: Tønsberg (1913-1935); Piraeus (1935-1937)
- Identification: Call sign MJVK (1913–33); Call sign LCGA (1934–35); Call sign SVIK (1935–37)
- Fate: Sunk, September 1, 1937

General characteristics
- Type: Tanker
- Tonnage: 6,987 GRT; 4,421 NRT; 10,360 DWT
- Length: 425 ft 5 in (129.67 m)
- Beam: 57 ft 1 in (17.40 m)
- Depth: 33 ft 1 in (10.08 m)
- Installed power: 555 Nhp
- Propulsion: George Clark, Ltd 3-cylinder triple expansion
- Speed: 10.5 knots

San Joaquin was a steam tanker built in 1913 by the Sir James Laing & Sons Ltd of Sunderland. She was the first of several tankers ordered by Wilhelm Wilhelmsen for their oil-carrying operations in the Pacific.

== Design and construction ==
In 1911, an English firm Fearnley & Eger and Wilhelm Wilhelmsen established the "Norwegian Africa and Australia Line" (NAAL). At about the same time the two companies also took over the "Norway Mexico Gulf Line" (NMGL) involved in oil and oil products transportation to South America. In 1913 the company ordered their first tanker to serve the California-South America route for NOK 1,862,527.25. The ship was laid down in 1913 at Sir James Laing & Sons Ltd. shipyard at Deptford, launched on November 14, 1913 (yard number 644), and commissioned on December 20 of the same year. As built, the ship was 435 feet 5 inches (132.72 m) long (between perpendiculars) and 57 feet 1 inch (17.40 m) abeam, a mean draft of 33 feet 1 inch (10.08 m). San Joaquin was assessed at 6,987 GRT, 4,421 NRT and 10,360 DWT. The vessel had a steel hull, and a single 555 nhp triple-expansion steam engine, with cylinders of 27-inch (69 cm), 45-inch (110 cm), and 74-inch (190 cm) diameter with a 54-inch (140 cm) stroke, that drove a single screw propeller, and moved the ship at up to 10.5 knots (12.1 mph; 19.4 km/h).

== Operational history ==
San Joaquin was delivered to Wilhelm Wilhemsen on 20 December 1913. Upon delivery, she was chartered by the Union Oil Company for 10 years and immediately sailed to San Francisco. San Joaquin left Newcastle-upon-Tyne on Christmas Day 1913 and on 2 February 1914 arrived on the US West Coast. The ship left San Francisco on March 8 for Chilean ports of Iquique and Antofagasta, stopping off to load oil at Port San Luis, the major oil storage and shipping facility for Union Oil. San Joaquin arrived in Antofagasta on March 29, and departed two days later for Iquique, before returning to San Francisco in mid April.

For the remainder of 1914 and through 1918, San Joaquin continued transporting oil from Port San Luis in California to Chilean ports of Taltal, Iquique, Antofagasta, and Tocopilla, with occasional trips to and from Mexico, or up the West Coast of the US. In 1919 San Joaquin was moved to the Gulf of Mexico, as Union Oil sought to fulfill its South American contracts by buying oil from Mexico. The tanker made regular trips from Tampico and Tuxpan on the Gulf Coast of Mexico to the same Chilean ports through early 1922. In April 1922, she returned to the West Coast, and delivered oil to Victoria on May 25, 1922, before resuming her South American routes.

By the mid-1920s, Wilhelm Wilhelmsen started to pull out of oil-carrying business, concentrating instead on oceanic liners. As a result, the company started slowly disposing of its tanker fleet. San Joaquin was acquired in June 1929 by a Norwegian whaling company A/S Hektor (operated by Nils Bugge) and renamed Melville. Hektor operated a whaling station on Deception Island and Melville served as a transportation ship for the company. Melville also transported members, equipment and aircraft of Sir George Hubert Wilkins's expedition in late 1929 on their way to the South Shetland Islands. Hektor invested a lot of resources in their whaling business in 1930, however, overproduction and a financial crisis led to a collapse of the market, and the entire Norwegian and part of the foreign whaling fleet had to be laid up in the 1931/32 season. As the company's financial position weakened, Hektor had to negotiate with their creditors to obtain a deferral which after prolonged negotiations was successfully obtained in 1936. However, as a result, the company had to sell most of its ships, including Melville which was bought in 1935 by a Greek Hellenic Tramp S. S. Co. who renamed the ship Iolcos.

=== Sinking ===
Following the outbreak of the Spanish Civil War, Greece declared neutrality. However, Metaxas saw the war as a great opportunity of making money and rearming Greek Armed Forces by selling ammunition and weapons to both parties of the conflict. Nationalists were furious with the Greeks selling weapons to Republicans, and even submitted a dossier to Greek ambassador in Burgos proving Greek government was complicit in selling arms to the Republicans. As a result, most Greek ships travelling in the Western Mediterranean were considered by Spanish Nationalists, as well as their German and Italian allies, as enemies.

On 1 September 1937, Iolcos which was just recently renamed Woodford and in the process of being transferred to the British registry, was on her journey from Constanta to Valencia with a full load of fuel oil. The tanker just made a call in Barcelona on August 27 but was unable to unload her cargo, and was travelling along the east coast of Spain. The ship was under command of captain Gregorij Dimitrov, a Bulgarian, and had a crew of 32 composed mostly of Greeks, Romanians and Hungarians. Around 06:30 in the morning, Italian submarine Diaspro sighted the tanker near Benicarló heading to Alicante. Not being able to catch up with the ship under water, Diaspro attacked the ship on the surface by launching two torpedoes. The ship crew spotted them, managed to maneuver and avoid them altogether, and made an attempt to ram the submarine. Diaspro fired two more torpedoes which hit the ship on the starboard side, around holds 5 and 8, and sank it in the position 40°09′N 00°46′E. Even though the ship was travelling under the British flag, the captain of the submarine, Giuseppe Mellina, believed the tanker was using a false name Woodford, as the crew appeared to be Romanian. As a result of the attack, the ship's second engineer died and six people were wounded. The rest of the tanker's crew successfully reached the Spanish coast.
