= SS Castillo de Olite =

- Official photo of Castillo de Olite

History
- Name: 1921: Zaandijk; 1930: Zwaterwater; 1935: Postyshev; 1938: Akedemik Pavlov; 1938: Castillo de Olite
- Namesake: 1921: Zaandijk; 1935: Pavel Postyshev; 1938: Palace of Olite
- Owner: 1921: NV Solleveld, Van der Meer & TH van Hattum's SM; 1930: NV Scheepvaart- & Steenkolen Maatschappij; 1935: USSR
- Operator: 1930: NVSM "Nederlandsche Lloyd"; 1938: Nationalist insurgents
- Port of registry: 1921: (Netherlands) Rotterdam; 1935: (Soviet Union) Odesa; 1938: (Spain)
- Builder: De Rotterdamsche Droogdok Maatschappij NV, Rotterdam
- Yard number: 69
- Laid down: 2 April 1920
- Launched: 20 November 1920
- Completed: 19 February 1921
- Identification: 1921: code letters QCVR; 1930: code letters QTDL
- Fate: Sunk by gunfire, 7 March 1939

General characteristics
- Type: cargo ship
- Tonnage: 3,545 GRT, 2,150 NRT
- Length: 110.1 m (361.3 ft)
- Beam: 15.2 m (49.8 ft)
- Draught: 6.60 m (21 ft 8 in)
- Depth: 6.7 m (22.0 ft)
- Installed power: 342 NHP
- Propulsion: triple-expansion engine
- Speed: 10 knots (19 km/h; 12 mph)
- Armament: In 1938: 1 × 120 mm Vickers gun; 1 × 57 mm Nordenfeldt gun

Castillo de Olite was a cargo steamship that was launched in 1920 in the Netherlands as Zaandijk. She passed through a series of Dutch and Soviet owners, and at different times was renamed Zwartewater, Postyshev and Akademik Pavlov. In 1938 the Spanish Nationalist Navy captured her and renamed her Castillo de Olite. In the last days of the Spanish Civil War she was sunk with great loss of life while serving as a troop ship. A total of 1,476 Nationalist soldiers were killed, making it the worst ship sinking in the history of Spain.

== Building ==
De Rotterdamsche Droogdok Maatschappij NV built the ship in Rotterdam, launching her on 20 November 1920 and completing her on 19 February 1921. Her registered length was 110.1 m (361.3 ft), her beam was 15.2 m (49.8 ft) and her depth was 6.7 m (22.0 ft). Her tonnages were 3,545 GRT and 2,150 NRT. She had a single screw, driven by a three-cylinder triple-expansion steam engine that was rated at 342 NHP.

== Career ==
Zaandijk's first owner was NV Solleveld, Van der Meer & TH van Hattum's Stoomvaart Maatschappij, who registered her in Rotterdam. Her code letters were QCVR. She traded to Java and Sumatra.

In 1930 NV Stoomvaart Maatschappij "Nederlandsche Lloyd" acquired Zaandijk and renamed her Zwartewater. She remained registered in Rotterdam, but her code letters were changed to QTDL.

In 1935 the USSR bought her, renamed her Postishev after the Ukrainian Communist Pavel Postyshev, and registered her in Odesa. In 1938 she was renamed Akedemik Pavlov.

On 31 May 1938 the Nationalist auxiliary cruiser Vicente Puchol captured Akademik Pavlov in the Strait of Gibraltar, when the latter was carrying a cargo of coal. She was incorporated in the Nationalist Spanish Navy as the Castillo de Olite, and armed with a 120 mm Vickers gun and a 57 mm Nordenfeldt gun.

== Sinking ==
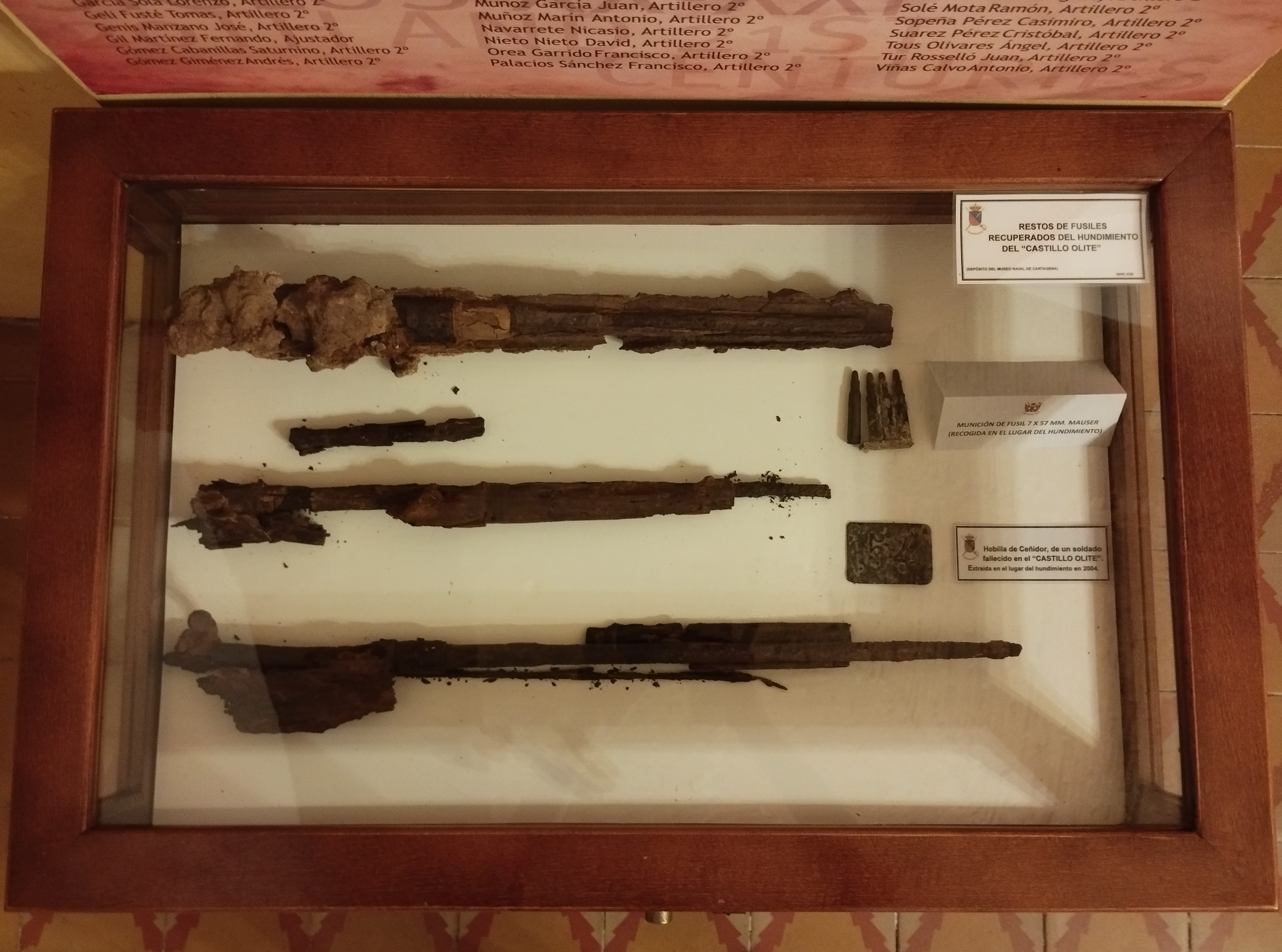
The remains of rifles recovered from the wreck in 2004, displayed at the Historical Military Museum of Cartagena

In the last days of the Spanish Civil War, Cartagena was one of the last Republican strongholds, and harboured most of the remaining Republican Navy. When the anti-communist Cartagena Uprising broke out, the Nationalists sent reinforcements to try to capture Cartagena and the Republican fleet.

With less than 48 hours preparation, the Nationalists sent from Castellón and Málaga a convoy of 16 ships, carrying more than 20,000 troops. The convoy comprised the Júpiter-class minelayers Júpiter, Marte and Vulcano, the auxiliary cruisers Lázaro, Jaime I, Domine and J.J. Sister and the transports Castillo de Olite, San Sebastián, Castillo Peñafiel, Gibraltar, Monforte, Mombeltrán, Huertas, Montealegre and Simancas.

The Republican fleet had left Cartagena for Oran, in Algeria, but the Republican Brigade 206 had retaken the port and its coastal defense batteries, thus preventing the Nationalist landing. The Nationalist ships retreated, except for Castillo de Olite, which had not received the order to withdraw, because her radio was out of order. As the ship approached the docks, the Republicans fired warning shots at them. However, the Nationalist troops, who were battle-hardened veterans of the war, thought the shots were from fellow rebels celebrating their arrival.

The commander of the battery which fired the deadly shot, Antonio Martínez Pallarés, had been reluctant to shoot, believing there was no point since the war was lost for the Republicans. Initially, he refused to fire any more shots. However, his superior, Cristóbal Guirao, was adamant on following orders to prevent Nationalist ships from entering the ports. Eventually, he pulled a gun on Pallarés and threatened to shoot him if he did not fire. At this, Pallarés relented. The one 152mm shell from a coastal battery hit her. She sank shortly afterwards, broken in two.

Of the 2,112 men aboard, 1,476 were killed, 342 were wounded and 294 were captured, after being rescued by local fishermen and the lighthouse keeper, Santiago Saavedra, and his wife, Carmen Hevia. Among the dead were members of the military court which would've carried out Nationalist repressions, including the head of the court, colonel Antonio Martín de la Escalera. This is one of the greatest losses of life from the sinking of a single ship in Spanish maritime history.

After the war, Pallarés was captured by the Nationalists. Although the ship was a legitimate military target, he was nevertheless sentenced to death for the sinking, as well as rebellion and an unproved charge of being a communist. He was shot on 7 March 1941, the anniversary of the sinking. Guirao fled to France. He later returned to Spain, where he died in 2007.
