= Galite Islands =

Tunisian archipelago

Galite
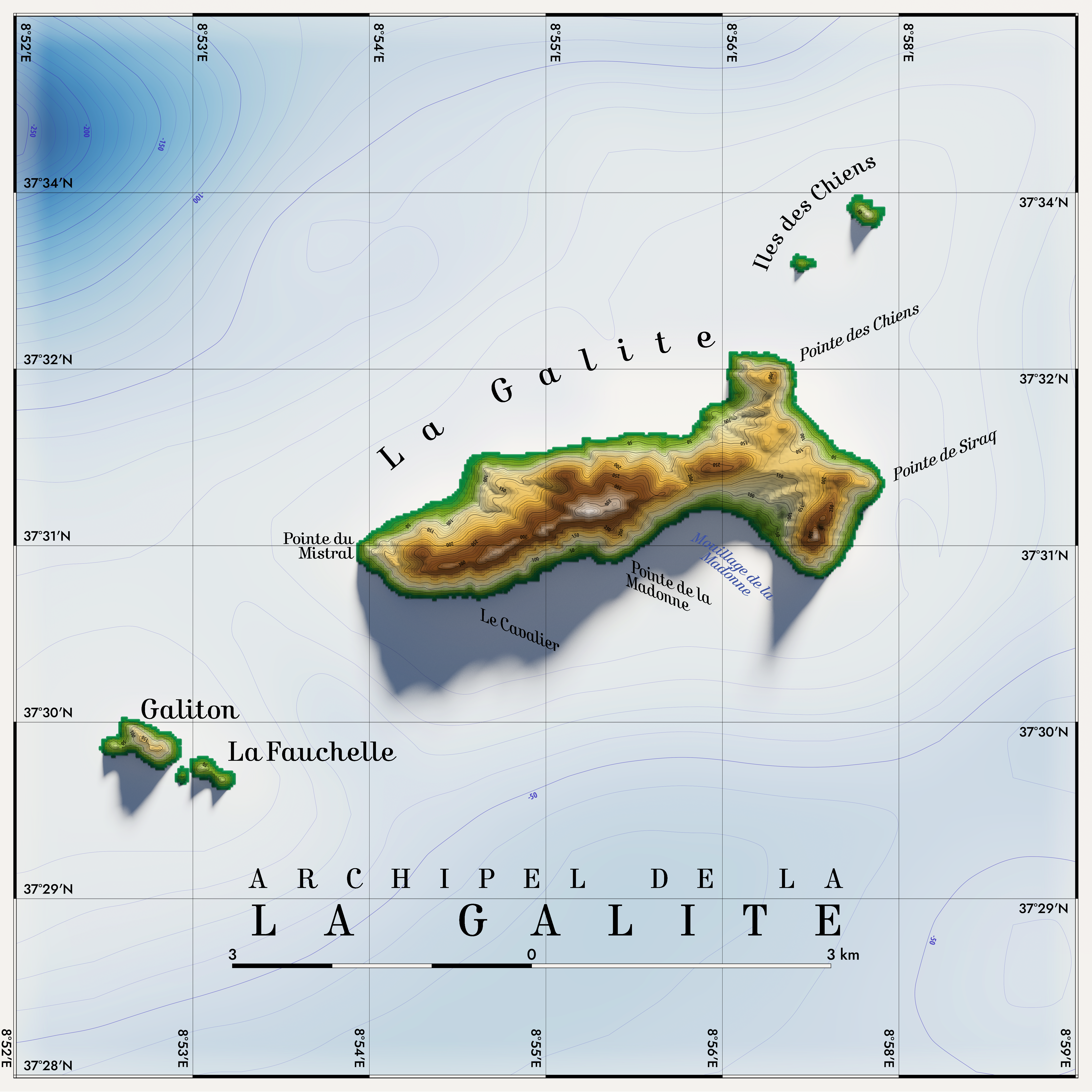
- Topographic map of La Galite

- Location within Tunisia

Geography
- Location: Mediterranean Sea
- Coordinates: 37°31′37″N 08°55′43″E
- Total islands: 6
- Major islands: La Galite (5.4 km^{2}); Le Galiton; La Fauchelle
- Area: 8.08 km^{2} (3.12 sq mi)
- Highest point: Bout de Somme (391 m)

Administration
- Tunisia
- Governorate: Bizerte Governorate

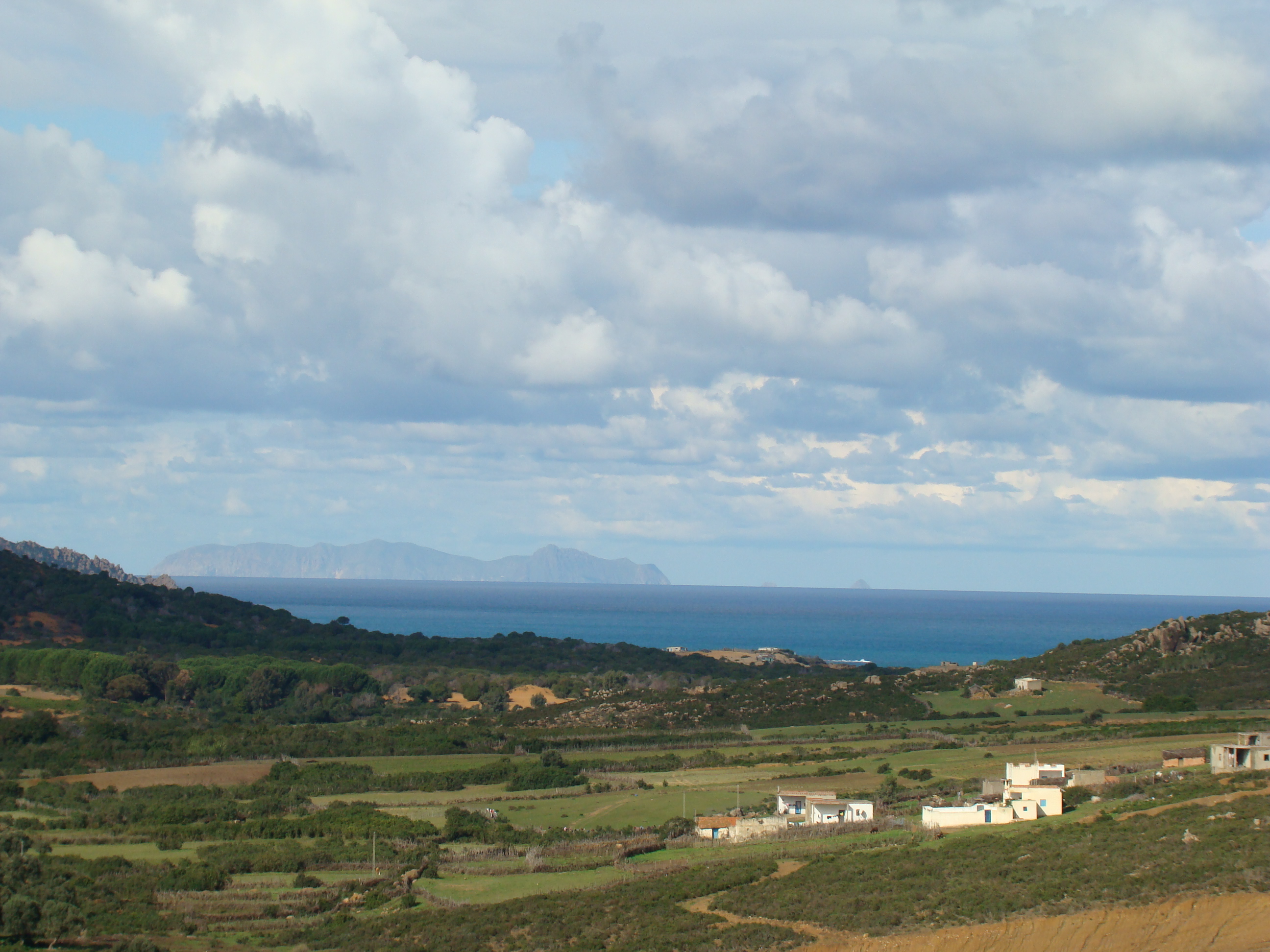
View of La Galite from Cap Serrat

The Galite Islands (Tunisian Arabic: جالطة Jalita, French: La Galite, Italian: La Galita) are a rocky group of islands of volcanic origin that belong to Bizerte Governorate, northern Tunisia. They are located 38 kilometres (24 miles) northwest of Cape Serrat, the closest point of the Tunisian mainland coast, from which they are separated by the Galite Channel, and almost 80 km (50 mi) north-by-northeast of the city of Tabarka, and 150 km (93 mi) south of Cape Spartivento in the south of Sardinia. The islands of the group sit atop Banc de Galite.

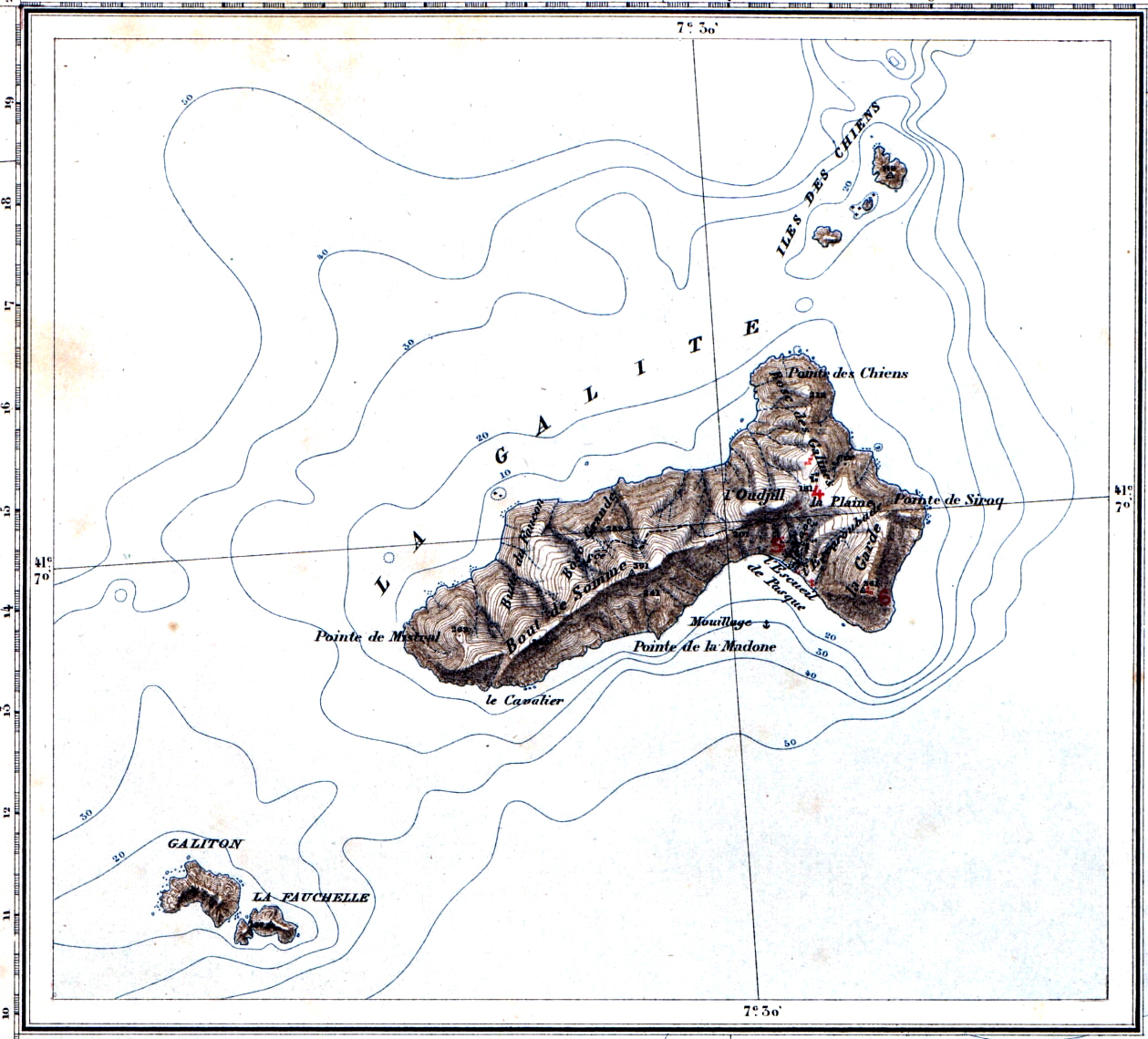
Old map of the Galite Islands

== Main island ==
The centrally situated main island La Galite is 5.4 km (3.4 mi) long east-west, and up to 2.9 km (1.8 mi) wide in the east. The area of the group is 9 square kilometres (3 sq mi), most of which La Galite accounts for. The main island has 200m high cliffs and is accessible only in the south on the bay Escueil de Pasque. A few fishing families live on the island. The highest peak at 391m is Bout de Somme (Grand Sommet), which is topped by a yellow lookout tower. Piton de l'Es', a prominent cone-shaped peak close to the most southeasterly point of the island, is 360m high.

== Other islands ==
Besides the main island La Galite, there are two groups of islets or rocks, which are all inaccessible.

The Galitons de l'Ouest, or West Galitons, are 3 km (2 mi) southwest of the main island. They consist of the second largest and third largest islands of the Galite Islands, 158m high Le Galiton (area 0.4 km^{2}) and 137m high La Fauchelle, immediately southeast of Le Galiton. On the peak of Le Galiton is a lighthouse, 14m high. In 1980, the Ministry of Agriculture declared Le Galiton a natural reserve, to protect the Mediterranean monk seals.

The smaller Galitons de l'Est, or East Galitons, also called Les Chiens or The Dogs, are at a distance between 1 and 2 km (1 mi) northeast of the main island. This group consists of three rocks, which are, from north to south, Gallo, Pollastro and Gallina (meaning "rooster", "chicken" and "hen" in Italian). Gallo is the largest of the three and is 119 m high.

About 25 km (16 mi) to the southwest are the Sorelle Rocks, or Écueil des Sorelles, which consist of two shallow rocky patches. A lighted buoy, fitted with a racon, is moored to the western patch, and another buoy to the eastern patch. A two meters high concrete block stands on the western patch.

13 km (8 mi) to the north of the group is the submerged Banc des Mazzarilles, with depths between 21 and 49 meters.

During World War II, La Galite hosted a small Italian naval base. Salvatore Todaro, an Italian war hero, died on La Galite on December 14, 1942.

Tunisian independence leader Habib Bourguiba was exiled to La Galite by the French colonial authorities from May 21, 1952 through May 20, 1954.

== Natural history ==
The islands have been recognised as an Important Bird Area (IBA) by BirdLife International because they support populations of Audouin's gulls, Eleonora's falcons and Sardinian warblers.

== Protection ==
The Tunisian military defends one of the islands as a small safety measure.
