= Eagle River (Alaska) =

Eagle River may refer to the following streams in the U.S. state of Alaska:

- Eagle River (Cook Inlet) flows through the community of Eagle River into Cook Inlet near Anchorage
- Eagle River (Favorite Channel) flows into Favorite Channel northwest of Juneau
- Eagle River (Bradfield Canal) empties into the Bradfield Canal near Wrangell

== See also ==
- Eagle River, Anchorage, Alaska, a suburb of Anchorage, Alaska
- Eagle Creek (Alaska), tributary of Yukon River in Alaska and Canada
- List of rivers of Alaska
