= Eagle River (Favorite Channel) =

- Location of the mouth of the Eagle River in Alaska

Location
- Country: United States
- State: Alaska
- Municipality: Juneau

Physical characteristics
- Source: Eagle Glacier
  - location: Coast Mountains, Tongass National Forest
  - coordinates: 58°35′16″N 134°43′26″W
  - elevation: 994 ft (303 m)
- Mouth: Favorite Channel
  - location: 20 miles (32 km) northwest of downtown Juneau
  - coordinates: 58°31′37″N 134°49′18″W
  - elevation: 0 ft (0 m)
- Length: 5 mi (8.0 km)

The Eagle River is a stream, 5 miles (8 km) long, in the borough of Juneau in the U.S. state of Alaska. Heading at Eagle Glacier in the Coast Mountains, it flows southwest into Favorite Channel, 20 miles (32 km) northeast of the city of Juneau. Alaska Route 7 (Glacier Highway) links the city to the river, a state recreation area, a church camp, and a boy scout camp near the river mouth.

Hiking trails parallel the river for its entire course. One, the Amalga Trail, leads to a public-use cabin on a lake near the foot of Eagle Glacier in the Tongass National Forest. Remnants of the forming mining town of Amalga and the Eagle Creek Mine are slightly north of the river along an unnamed tributary.

== Course ==
Beginning at Eagle Glacier in the Coast Mountains of Southeast Alaska, Eagle River flows generally southwest for about 5 miles (8 km) through parts of the Tongass National Forest. Its headwaters include a small unnamed lake, along the right bank of which runs a hiking trail, the Amalga Trail. Also on the right near the downstream end of the lake is Eagle Glacier Cabin, a public-use structure managed by the United States Forest Service.

On the upper and middle reaches of the river, small unnamed tributaries enter from the left and right. One of them, entering from the right downstream of Eagle Glacier Cabin, drains the Amalga Site, remnants of the Eagle River Mine and the former mining town of Amalga.

Along its lower reaches, the river borders Eagle Beach State Recreation Area, which is on the right. The Amalga Trail, which here is part of the recreation area, is also on the right. Also to the right, surrounded by recreation area land, is a United Methodist Church camp. Loop Trail runs around the camp, intersecting Amalga Trail along the river. Slightly downstream of the trail junction, the river passes under Alaska Route 7 (Glacier Highway) and receives the Herbert River from the left.

Beyond the confluence with the Herbert, Eagle River flows by tidal flats on the left and right. Here, Loop Trail runs along the right bank until it meets Beach Access Trail, which leads to a beach picnic area. Boy Scout Beach Trail, associated with the scout camp, across the river from the church camp, follows the left bank. Saturday Creek, which flows through Methodist Camp, enters from the right, before Eagle River empties into Favorite Channel.

Eagle Beach is 2 miles (3 km) north of Dotsons Landing and about 20 miles (32 km) northwest of Juneau. The river mouth is opposite Shelter and Lincoln islands, which separate Favorite Channel from Saginaw Channel, to the west. The Alaska Marine Highway runs along Favorite Channel between the islands and Eagle Beach.

== See also ==
- List of rivers of Alaska
