= List of shipwrecks in 1937 =

The list of shipwrecks in 1937 includes ships sunk, foundered, grounded, or otherwise lost during 1937.

table of contents
1937
Jan	Feb	Mar	Apr
May	Jun	Jul	Aug
Sep	Oct	Nov	Dec
Unknown date

== January ==
=== 1 January ===
List of shipwrecks: 1 January 1937
Ship	State	Description
Crackshot	United Kingdom	The cargo ship ran aground on Scroby Sands, Norfolk, England. She was refloated on 5 January.
Monte Carlo	United States	Monte Carlo, 2010 The 310 foot concrete hulled former tanker, being used as a gambling/casino ship, was driven ashore at Coronado, California, and was wrecked.

=== 2 January ===
List of shipwrecks: 2 January 1937
Ship	State	Description
Harold Bird	United States	The mail boat was destroyed by fire when the tanker J. Oswald Boyd (United States) exploded and caught fire in Lake Michigan with the loss of five lives. J. Oswald Boyd was also destroyed.
J. Oswald Boyd	United States	The tanker was destroyed by an explosion and fire in Lake Michigan with the loss of five lives.
Glen Tanar	United Kingdom	The 876 GRT coaster on a passage from Granton to Ålvik with a cargo of coke, foundered in Hardangerfjord, Norway. All crew were rescued.

=== 3 January ===
List of shipwrecks: 3 January 1937
Ship	State	Description
Elmira	United States	The 14-gross register ton motor vessel drifted ashore and broke up on Fanshaw Beach (57°12′N 133°33′W) in Southeast Alaska after her mooring chain broke during a gale. Her crew of two survived.

=== 6 January ===
List of shipwrecks: 6 January 1937
Ship	State	Description
Jose Maria Martinez	Spanish Navy	Spanish Civil War: The auxiliary patrol ship was lost on this date.
San Antonio	Spain	The tug collided with Stanhill (United Kingdom) at Gijón and sank with the loss of twelve crew.

=== 7 January ===
List of shipwrecks: 7 January 1937
Ship	State	Description
Sally Maersk	Denmark	The cargo ship ran aground in the Saloum River, French West Africa. She was refloated about a month later.

=== 9 January ===
List of shipwrecks: 9 January 1937
Ship	State	Description
Chinning	China	The cargo ship collided with Haiyi (China) off Nanking and was beached.
Hoyo Maru	Japan	The tanker ran aground on Tanegashima. She was reported as still aground in March 1937.
Umbertas	Italy	The 877 GRT cargo ship on a passage from Venice to Catania with general cargo, collided with Morea (Italy) off Grossa, Corsica, France and sank. The crew were rescued by Morea.

=== 10 January ===
List of shipwrecks: 10 January 1937
Ship	State	Description
M.F. 4	France	The 196 GRT coaster on a passage from Bordeaux to Vannes with a cargo of cement ran aground during the foggy conditions and was wrecked at Les Grands Cardinaux (near Belle Île).
Roche Castle	United Kingdom	The 307 GRT motor trawler ran aground on the rocks about 2 miles west of Eynon, Gower during a heavy storm, while attempting to return to Swansea. Ten crewmembers were saved, and one was killed.
San Sebastian	United Kingdom	The 126-foot (38 m), 271 GRT steam trawler, a sold off Canadian TR class naval trawler, stranded on rocks off Iommalach, 2 miles (3.2 km) off Ardbeg, Islay in heavy rain, a total loss. Eight crew were rescued off rocks after seven hours, her captain off another rock after ten hours. Four crew died.

=== 11 January ===
List of shipwrecks: 11 January 1937
Ship	State	Description
Vierge Marie	Belgium	The 112 GRT motor trawler hit the rocks in heavy seas, strong wind and heavy fog conditions off Cornwall near Newlyn. Four out of six crew members died.
Volgas	Greece	The cargo ship came ashore near Paximadi lighthouse, southwest of Milos Island in the Aegean Sea on a voyage from Mersin to Hamburg with a cargo of grain. Salvage was abandoned on 16 January and she was declared a total loss.

=== 12 January ===
List of shipwrecks: 12 January 1937
Ship	State	Description
Aikoku Maru	Japan	The 3,212 GRT cargo ship on a passage from Otaru to Shimidzu with a cargo of coal broke in two and foundered in a snowstorm off the Shakotan Cape, Hokkaidō with some loss of life.
Johanna Thornden	Finland	The 3,223 GRT cargo ship on a voyage from New York to Gothenburg with general cargo ran aground on Swona, Orkney Islands, United Kingdom with the loss of 30 of her 38 crew.
St. Michel	France	The ketch was driven ashore and wrecked between Charmouth and Lyme Regis, Dorset, United Kingdom.
Totnes	United Kingdom	The 283 GRT coaster on a passage from Tyne to Golspie with a cargo of coal, came ashore at Golspie, Sutherland. All crew were rescued.

=== 13 January ===
List of shipwrecks: 13 January 1937
Ship	State	Description
Aladdin	Norway	The 1,995 GRT cargo ship on a voyage from Nuevitas, Cuba to Boston with a cargo of sugar stranded in the mouth of Nuevitas Harbour, broke in two and sank.
Silvercypress	United Kingdom	The 6,770 GRT motor vessel on a voyage form New York to Shanghai with a cargo of chemicals developed a fire in her engine room which spread to the rest of the ship. She was beached at Guimaris Island near Iloilo, Philippines. Silvercypress was later declared a constructive total loss and sold for scrapping. She was towed to Manila and sold to Japanese breakers. She was repaired and renamed Yasukawa Maru.

=== 14 January ===
List of shipwrecks: 14 January 1937
Ship	State	Description
Frangoula Vrondisi	Greece	The cargo ship was driven ashore at Mantoudi in a storm. She was refloated on 17 January.

=== 16 January ===
List of shipwrecks: 16 January 1937
Ship	State	Description
Mary Sinclair	United Kingdom	The schooner was abandoned in a sinking condition off Liverpool, Lancashire. The crew were rescued by the dredger Hilbre Island (United Kingdom). Mary Sinclair was towed into Liverpool by Salvor (United Kingdom).

=== 17 January ===
List of shipwrecks: 17 January 1937
Ship	State	Description
Goizeko Izarra	Spanish Navy	Spanish Civil War: The Basque Navy auxiliary patrol ship/naval trawler was sunk by a mine in the Cantabrian Sea.
Michalis	Greece	The cargo ship ran aground at Paloma, California, United States. She was refloated on 13 March.

=== 18 January ===
List of shipwrecks: 18 January 1937
Ship	State	Description
Duhnen	Kriegsmarine	The schooner was driven ashore on Fehmarn, Germany.
Fairplay 10	Germany	The tug was driven ashore on Fehmarn, Germany. The crew were rescued by a Kriegsmarine minesweeper.
Felce	Italy	The cargo ship ran aground at Djibouti, French Somaliland. Cargo was discharged and she was refloated with the assistance of a tug.
Laurette	France	The 328 GRT Mersey-class steam trawler last reported off Utsire, not since heard of. Presumed sunk with all hands in the gale.
Mary-Toya	Spanish Navy	Spanish Civil War: The Basque Navy auxiliary minesweeper was sunk by a mine in the Cantabrian Sea. Six crewmen killed.
Penton	United Kingdom	The cargo ship ran aground at Gorleston, Suffolk. All crew were rescued by the Gorleston Lifeboat. She was refloated on 21 October.
Trym	Norway	The 1,909 GRT cargo ship on a voyage from Kirkenes to Middlesbrough with a cargo of iron ore sprang a leak in the North Sea during a storm and issued an SOS. All crew were rescued by Venus (United Kingdom) on 20 May. Trym foundered.
Welle	Kriegsmarine	The converted trawler foundered in the Bight of Kiel off Fehmarn with the loss of all 25 crew.

=== 19 January ===
List of shipwrecks: 19 January 1937
Ship	State	Description
Oued Zem	France	The cargo ship ran aground at Mazagam, Morocco. She was refloated on 10 May.

=== 20 January ===
List of shipwrecks: 20 January 1937
Ship	State	Description
Mewa XIII	Poland	The coaster became stranded by ice at Darßer Ort, Mecklenburg-Vorpommern, Germany. All crew left the ship.
Savonmaa	Finland	The 1,820 GRT cargo ship on a voyage from Viipuri to Manchester with a cargo of wood and pulp, ran aground near the Songvår Lighthouse, Norway and sank with the loss of all hands.
Shige Maru	Japan	The 305 GRT coaster sank off Idzu with the loss of all hands.

=== 21 January ===
List of shipwrecks: 21 January 1937
Ship	State	Description
M 12	France	The dredger foundered in a storm near Marseille, Bouches-du-Rhône.
Roosevelt	United States	The oceangoing steam tug was deliberately beached in the Old French Canal at Cristóbal, Panama Canal Zone, and abandoned.
Therese	United Kingdom	The cargo ship ran aground in Blyth Bay. She was refloated on 13 March.

=== 23 January ===
List of shipwrecks: 23 January 1937
Ship	State	Description
Karmt	Norway	The 1,610 GRT cargo ship on a passage from Port Talbot to Bergen with a cargo of steelplates foundered in the North Sea 70 nautical miles (130 km) north of the Shetland Islands, United Kingdom with the loss of one of her sixteen crew. Survivors were rescued by Leda (Norway).

=== 24 January ===
List of shipwrecks: 24 January 1937
Ship	State	Description
Amethyst	United Kingdom	The 357 GRT steam trawler on passage from White Sea to Hull, last reported while 240 miles southwest of Svinø, not since heard of. Presumed sunk with all hands in a gale sweeping the North Sea.
English Trader	United Kingdom	The cargo ship ran aground at Dartmouth, Devon. All 52 crew were rescued by the Torbay Lifeboat. She was refloated on 22 February.
Griesheim	Germany	The 4,998 GRT cargo ship on a voyage from Narvik to Rotterdam with a cargo of iron ore, ran aground at Brønnøysund, Norway and broke in two.
Spyros	Greece	The 2,108 GRT cargo ship on a passage from Istanbul to Hamburg was wrecked off Portimão, Algarve, Portugal with the loss of seven crew.

=== 25 January ===
List of shipwrecks: 25 January 1937
Ship	State	Description
Spartivento	Italy	The cargo ship ran aground at Punta Mala, Spain. She was refloated on 8 February.

=== 26 January ===
List of shipwrecks: 26 January 1937
Ship	State	Description
Fairy	United Kingdom	The 249 GRT coaster on a passage from Goole to Aberdeen with a cargo of sugar pulp, was driven ashore 6 nautical miles (11 km) north of Aberdeen in a gale and was wrecked. All crew were rescued by the Aberdeen Lifeboat.
Metinda	United Kingdom	The tug foundered at Scapa Flow, Orkney Islands in a storm.
Terneuzen	United Kingdom	The 2,472 GRT cargo ship on a passage from Sas van Gent to Setúbal, Portugal in ballast, ran aground at Setubal in a storm. Salvage operations were abandoned on 15 April. She was refloated on 20 September and subsequently sold by the insurers to Sea & Land Securities Ltd., London, who repaired and returned her to service in 1938.

=== 27 January ===
List of shipwrecks: 27 January 1937
Ship	State	Description
Horisonte	Portugal	The schooner sank in Leixões harbour after a collision with Ingria (Norway). She was refloated in 1939, repaired and returned to service.
Jonge Jacobus	Netherlands	The 1,757 GRT cargo ship on a passage from Antwerp to Alexandria with general cargo, foundered in the Atlantic Ocean off the coast of Portugal with the loss of all hands.
Peter H. Crowell	United States	The cargo ship struck a submerged object in the Cape Cod Canal and was beached.
Satis	United Kingdom	The sailing barge was blown ashore at North Wootton, Norfolk in a storm.
Toxteth	United Kingdom	The tug capsized and sank at Brunswick Dock, Liverpool, Lancashire with the loss of four of her five crew. She was assisting Pegu (United Kingdom) at the time. Toxteth was raised on 1 February and beached.

=== 28 January ===
List of shipwrecks: 28 January 1937
Ship	State	Description
Ashanti	United Kingdom	The coaster was driven aground at Leixões, Portugal in a storm. She was refloated on 10 May.
San Matteo	Italy	The 3,757 GRT cargo ship on a voyage from Gdynia to Gibraltar with a cargo of coal, was wrecked on the Stolp Bank in a heavy gale with a loss of all 40 of her crew.

=== 29 January ===
List of shipwrecks: 29 January 1937
Ship	State	Description
Baron Polwarth	United Kingdom	The 3,661 GRT cargo ship on a voyage from Vizagapatam to Workington with a cargo of ore, ran aground on Juan de Nova Island, Madagascar. She broke her back and was a total loss.
Kakariki	United Kingdom	The 887 GRT coaster on a passage from Tasmania to Melbourne with a cargo of pyrites, collided with Caradale off the Gelibrand Pile Light and sank in Port Philip Bay, Victoria, Australia with the loss of six of her 24 crew.
Olifer	Germany	The 1,095 GRT coastal tanker on a voyage from Rotterdam to Hamburg with a cargo of mineral oil, ran aground off Borkum, Germany and sank (53°50′N 6°32′E) with the loss of eleven of her fourteen crew.

=== Unknown date ===
List of shipwrecks: Unknown Date January 1937
Ship	State	Description
Nellie Juan #33	United States	The 8-gross register ton motor vessel sank in Prince William Sound on the south-central coast of the Territory of Alaska with the loss of the only person aboard. An Alaska Native found his body on 31 January.
USS Stribling	United States Navy	The decommissioned Wickes-class destroyer was sunk as a target in the Pacific Ocean off San Pedro, California.

== February ==
=== 1 February ===
List of shipwrecks: 1 February 1937
Ship	State	Description
Good Shepherd	United Kingdom	The coaster was driven ashore at Fair Isle and was wrecked.
Vincent-Davin	France	The 529 GRT coaster, former United States Navy minelayer General Henry Knox, ran aground at the mouth of Sông Cả River, Annam while on a passage from Haiphong to Ben Thuy with a cargo of coal.

=== 2 February ===
List of shipwrecks: 2 February 1937
Ship	State	Description
Aija	Latvia	The 571 GRT coaster foundered in the Baltic Sea due to ice near Kolkasrags whilst on a voyage from Liepāja to Riga with general cargo. The crew were rescued by the icebreakers Lāčplēsis and Krišjānis Valdemārs (Latvia).
Conde	France	The passenger ship collided with Bullaren (Sweden) in the Scheldt off Terneuzen, Zeeland Netherlands. She was severely damaged and was beached to prevent her sinking.
Delfin	Spain	Spanish Civil War: The cargo ship was torpedoed and damaged in the Mediterranean Sea by a submarine, suspected to be German. She was beached at Torrox.
Greenland	United Kingdom	The cargo ship ran aground at Kristiansand, Norway, sprang a leak and then was beached.

=== 3 February ===
List of shipwrecks: 3 February 1937
Ship	State	Description
Aaro	Denmark	The cargo ship came ashore on the west coast of Bornholm. She was refloated on 8 February but was severely damaged.
Lysaker II	Norway	The cargo ship collided with A. P. Bernstoff (Denmark) at Esbjerg, Denmark and sank. All crew were rescued.
Roko Maru	Japan	The cargo ship came ashore at Hachinohe, Aomori. She was refloated on 13 February.

=== 6 February ===
List of shipwrecks: 6 February 1937
Ship	State	Description
Birgit	Denmark	The 149 GRT coaster left Copenhagen for Gdynia with a cargo of iron filings. Not since heard of, presumed foundered.

=== 7 February ===
List of shipwrecks: 7 February 1937
Ship	State	Description
Artabro	Spanish Navy	Spanish Civil War: The patrol boat was sunk at Málaga by Nationalist aircraft.
I-2 and I-4	Spanish Navy	Spanish Civil War: The I-1-class motor patrol boats were scuttled at Málaga. Salvaged and placed in Nationalist service.
River Avon	United Kingdom	The 202 GRT steam trawler on her return trip from fishing grounds, ran aground near North Carr Lightship while trying to round the Fife Ness. All the crew was saved, but the ship was declared a total loss.

=== 8 February ===
List of shipwrecks: 8 February 1937
Ship	State	Description
Navarra	Spain	Spanish Civil War: The 1,693 GRT cargo ship on a voyage from Marseille to Cartagena with general cargo provided by the French Aid Committee, but also including contraband military equipment, was torpedoed and damaged in the Mediterranean Sea by the Nationalist submarine Ferraris. She was beached at Altafulla, Catalonia.
Xauen	Spanish Navy	Spanish Civil War: The Uad Kert-class naval trawler was scuttled at Melaga. Raised, repaired and put in Nationalist service in 1938.

=== 9 February ===
List of shipwrecks: 9 February 1937
Ship	State	Description
Luneda	United Kingdom	The 129.9-foot (39.6 m), 288 GRT steam trawler stranded on rocks off Carmichael's Rock, off Ardbeg, Islay in a heavy snowstorm with zero visibility and large swells, a total loss. Her crew was rescued by Pibroch (United Kingdom).

=== 10 February ===
List of shipwrecks: 10 February 1937
Ship	State	Description
Cottoneva	United States	The 1,113 GRT auxiliary schooner was loading lumber at Port Orford when a storm hit the harbor. High winds pushed the ship onto shore, and she ran aground on Battle Rock, Port Orford, Oregon and was wrecked.

=== 11 February ===
List of shipwrecks: 11 February 1937
Ship	State	Description
Grigorio P	Greece	The coaster ran aground at Katakolo after her rudder broke and was wrecked.

=== 12 February ===
List of shipwrecks: 12 February 1937
Ship	State	Description
Choho Maru	Japan	The 326 GRT coaster on a passage from Misumi to Osaka with a cargo of rice and starch, stranded near Hirado, Nagasaki and subsequently sank, with the loss of six of her fourteen crew.

=== 13 February ===
List of shipwrecks: 13 February 1937
Ship	State	Description
Eleni T	Greece	The cargo ship collided in the Mediterranean Sea off Tarifa, Andalusia, Spain (35°38′N 6°40′W) with an unidentified warship during foggy weather. She was abandoned by her crew, who were rescued by Berwickshire (United Kingdom). Elent T was escorted to Campamento and beached. She was refloated the next day and towed to Gibraltar.
Hematite	United Kingdom	The 722 GRT coaster on a passage from Dublin to Newport in ballast, struck a rock in the Irish Sea near Bishops and Clerks, was abandoned by her eleven crew and sank.
Misaki Maru No.2	Japan	The cargo ship ran aground at Same, Aomori. She was refloated on 29 June.
Octavia	United Kingdom	The 108.9-foot (33.2 m), 173-ton steam trawler was sunk in a collision with the trawler George Cousins (United Kingdom) 12 miles (19 km) southeast of Maughold Head, Isle of Man in 23.5-metre (77 ft) of water. Her crew was rescued by George Cousins.

=== 14 February ===
List of shipwrecks: 14 February 1937
Ship	State	Description
Konoshita Maru	Japan	The tanker ran aground near the Ōmazaki Lighthouse, Honshū.
Otaru Maru	Japan	The cargo ship sprang a leak off Same, Aomori and a distress signal was sent. She foundered with the loss of all hands.
Zapora	United States	During a voyage in the Territory of Alaska from Hoonah to Petersburg with seven passengers, a crew of 20, and a cargo of 66,000 pounds (29,937 kg) of frozen fish and baggage, the 479-gross register ton, 151.3-foot (46.1 m) steamer was wrecked without loss of life at Rocky Point off Chaik Bay (57°19′N 134°35′W) in Southeast Alaska.

=== 15 February ===
List of shipwrecks: 15 February 1937
Ship	State	Description
Yung Chi	China	Struck rocks off Makung, Pescadores and was beached. In August 1937 she was used as a blockship at Kiangyin, Yangtse River.

=== 16 February ===
List of shipwrecks: 16 February 1937
Ship	State	Description
Our Girls	United Kingdom	The Thames barge sank in the River Thames at Greenwich with the loss of her master.

=== 17 February ===
List of shipwrecks: 17 February 1937
Ship	State	Description
Edward Luckenbach	United States	The cargo ship was beached after she collided with the cargo ship Feltre (Italy) in the Columbia River at Rainier, Oregon. She eventually was refloated.
Feltre	Italy	The cargo ship sank after she collided with the cargo ship Edward Luckenbach (United States) in the Columbia River at Rainier, Oregon. She was raised on 22 March.

=== 18 February ===
List of shipwrecks: 18 February 1937
Ship	State	Description
Haytian	United Kingdom	The coal hulk was hit by HMS PC.74 (Royal Navy) at Portland, Dorset and sank. The crew of 14 was rescued. She was raised on 24 August, returned to service; during World War II she was bombed and sunk.

=== 22 February ===
List of shipwrecks: 22 February 1937
Ship	State	Description
Benjamin B. Odell	United States	The passenger-cargo steamboat of the Central Hudson Steamboat Company tied up for the winter season at the Rosoff dock at Marlborough was completely destroyed by a mysterious fire.

=== 25 February ===
List of shipwrecks: 25 February 1937
Ship	State	Description
Llandovery Castle	United Kingdom	Spanish Civil War: The ocean liner struck a mine off Cape Creus, Spain and was damaged. She sailed to Port-Vendres, Pyrénées-Orientales, France and was beached.

=== 28 February ===
List of shipwrecks: 28 February 1937
Ship	State	Description
Airston	United Kingdom	The 141 GRT barge/lighter on a voyage from Colne River to London with a cargo of sand foundered in the North Sea off Clacton-on-Sea, Essex with the loss of all four crew.
Athina Livanos	Greece	The cargo ship ran aground at Warrenby, Yorkshire, United Kingdom. She was refloated on 13 March.
Stancrest	United Kingdom	The 462 GRT coaster left London for Bridgwater with a cargo of cement on 27 February, passed St. Catherine's Point, Isle of Wight next day. No further trace, presumed foundered in the English Channel with the loss of all nine crew.

=== Unknown date ===
List of shipwrecks: Unknown Date February 1937
Ship	State	Description
Arapiles	Spanish Navy	Spanish Civil War: The auxiliary patrol ship was lost sometime in February.
Beacon Star	United Kingdom	The 88.3-foot (26.9 m), 99-ton steam trawler was lost with all hands. She was last heard from off Eddystone Light on 18 February, she failed to answer calls the next day.

== March ==
=== 1 March ===
List of shipwrecks: 1 March 1937
Ship	State	Description
Jolanda	Italy	The 1,243 GRT cargo ship on a voyage from Olhão to Gibraltar with general cargo, foundered in the Atlantic Ocean 80 nautical miles (150 km; 92 mi) west of Gibraltar. Seventeen crew were rescued by Tuscania (United Kingdom).

=== 4 March ===
List of shipwrecks: 4 March 1937
Ship	State	Description
Achuri	Spain	The cargo ship passed Flamborough Head, Yorkshire, United Kingdom bound for Bilbao. No further trace, presumed foundered with the loss of all hands.
Loukia	Greece	Spanish Civil War: The 2,143 GRT tanker on a passage from Constanta to Barcelona with a cargo of benzine hit a mine and sank in the Gulf of Rosas off Cape San Sebastián, Catalonia. There was only one survivor.
Suecia	Sweden	The ocean liner was rammed and sunk at Gothenburg, Sweden, by Kollbjørg (Norway), which was being launched by Eriksbergs Mekaniska Verkstads AB. She was raised, repaired and returned to service in June 1937.

=== 5 March ===
List of shipwrecks: 5 March 1937
Ship	State	Description
Legazpi	Spain	Spanish Civil War: The ship was bombed by Nationalist aircraft at Tamarit and was abandoned by her crew. She came ashore at Llefrach.
Nabarra	Spanish Navy	Spanish Civil War: Battle of Cape Machichao: The Basque Navy patrol boat/naval trawler was sunk at Málaga by Canarias (Spanish Navy). 29 crewmen including her captain were killed and 20 captured.

=== 6 March ===
List of shipwrecks: 6 March 1937
Ship	State	Description
Favorita	United Kingdom	The 137.1-foot (41.8 m), 314 GRT trawler was wrecked on Skagi Reef (Gardskagi), Reykjavík, Iceland . One crewman was killed launching her boat. Survivors were rescued by Northern Reward (United Kingdom).
Frank H. Buck	United States	The 6,077 GRT tanker on a passage from Ventura to San Francisco with a cargo of oil, collided with President Coolidge (United States) in San Francisco Bay near the Golden Gate Bridge and was beached. All crew were rescued. She broke in two on 20 March and was declared a total loss.

=== 7 March ===
List of shipwrecks: 7 March 1937
Ship	State	Description
Kantoeng	Netherlands	The dredger sprang a leak, capsized in the Atlantic Ocean three nautical miles (5.6 km; 3.5 mi) off the Eddystone Lighthouse. She was beached at Fowey, Cornwall and was refloated on 7 September.

=== 8 March ===
List of shipwrecks: 8 March 1937
Ship	State	Description
Delia	Canada	The 1,276 GRT cargo ship on a passage from St. John's to Halifax with a cargo of cod was crushed by ice in the Trepassey Bay off Cape Race, Newfoundland and was abandoned by her crew.

=== 10 March ===
List of shipwrecks: 10 March 1937
Ship	State	Description
Galatia T	United Kingdom	The cargo ship caught fire at Bastia, Corsica, France. She sank on 12 March.
Jeanette	Netherlands	The cargo ship struck the pier at Londonderry Port, County Londonderry, Northern Ireland and was holed. She was beached at Moville, County Donegal, Ireland.
Laila	Denmark	The cargo ship caught fire at Charleston, South Carolina, was beached and was refloated the following day.

=== 11 March ===
List of shipwrecks: 11 March 1937
Ship	State	Description
Hermann Söhle	Nazi Germany	The 243 GRT steam trawler ran aground and was wrecked near Brevik while travelling between Harstad and Andenes.
Hop Sang	United Kingdom	The 2,149 GRT cargo ship on a voyage from Takao to Keelung with a cargo of gasoline and kerosene ran aground 1 mile east of Garanbi Lighthouse.

=== 14 March ===
List of shipwrecks: 14 March 1937
Ship	State	Description
Oldenburg	Nazi Germany	The cargo ship was heavily damaged in a collision with Fulda (Nazi Germany) on the Schelde River and was beached. The vessel was refloated and returned to service.

=== 15 March ===
List of shipwrecks: 15 March 1937
Ship	State	Description
Haiping	China	The 1,948 GRT cargo ship on a voyage from Sydney to Rabaul with a cargo of coal sprang a leak and was abandoned off Double Island Point, Queensland, and subsequently sank. The crew was saved by Mildura (United Kingdom).
Iristo	Norway	The 1,821 GRT cargo ship on a passage from St. John's to Hamilton ran aground five nautical miles (9.3 km; 5.8 mi) north of St. George's Island, Bermuda. She was refloated but sank whilst under tow to St. George's.

=== 16 March ===
List of shipwrecks: 16 March 1937
Ship	State	Description
Avon Queen	United Kingdom	The schooner was abandoned in the Atlantic Ocean (24°36′N 74°17′W). Her crew were rescued by USS Fairfax (United States Navy), which scuttled the ship.
HMS Torrid	Royal Navy	The R-class destroyer ran aground at Flushing, Cornwall whilst under tow to the breakers. Declared unsalvageable, the wreck was scrapped in situ in 1940.

=== 17 March ===
List of shipwrecks: 17 March 1937
Ship	State	Description
Hall Caine	United Kingdom	The 214 GRT coaster on a passage from Sydney to Port Macquarie with general cargo, sprang a leak and subsequently foundered off Broken Bay, New South Wales, Australia. All crew were rescued by Idant (United Kingdom).

=== 20 March ===
List of shipwrecks: 20 March 1937
Ship	State	Description
America	Argentina	The 2,686 GRT passenger-cargo ship on a passage from Puerto Belgrano to Puerto Madryn with a cargo of coal, ran aground near the Punta Delgada. All 44 passengers and 31 crew were rescued by Chaco (Argentina). The ship was abandoned as a total loss.

=== 22 March ===
List of shipwrecks: 22 March 1937
Ship	State	Description
Marie Moller	United Kingdom	The 4,877 GRT cargo ship on a passage from Vizagapatam to Liverpool with a cargo of nuts and oil cake, caught fire in the Irish Sea, exploded and was abandoned in the early hours of 23 March off Holyhead, Anglesey. All crew survived. Marie Moller came ashore at Holyhead.
Ziva	Finland	The cargo ship caught fire in the Baltic Sea 50 nautical miles (93 km; 58 mi) off Öland, Sweden, was abandoned by her crew She and was towed into Oscarshamn despite being severely damaged.

=== 23 March ===
List of shipwrecks: 23 March 1937
Ship	State	Description
Bjerkli	Norway	The 1,106 GRT cargo ship on a passage from Tampico to Denmark with a cargo of oil cake foundered in the Atlantic Ocean 570 nautical miles (1,060 km; 660 mi) south east of Boston, Massachusetts, United States. All crew were rescued by the cutter USCGC Chelan ( United States Coast Guard).
Jinkai Maru	Japan	The 3,835 GRT cargo ship on a voyage from Miike to Hong Kong with a cargo of coal, ran aground at Waglan Island, Hong Kong. She sank on 26 March.

=== 25 March ===
List of shipwrecks: 25 March 1937
Ship	State	Description
Jaime Girona	Spain	The 2,434 GRT cargo ship struck a rock in Santander Bay, and was subsequently beached near Santander, Cantabria.

=== 26 March ===
List of shipwrecks: 26 March 1937
Ship	State	Description
Fijian	Panama	The 3,381 GRT cargo ship on a passage from San Francisco to Lae with general cargo, exploded and subsequently sank while approximately five nautical miles (9.3 km; 5.8 mi) from Aurh Island. The crew was saved by the steamer Shinko Maru and were disembarked at Jaluit.

=== 27 March ===
List of shipwrecks: 27 March 1937
Ship	State	Description
Democraat	Netherlands	The cargo ship ran aground on Vlieland, Friesland. She was refloated on 12 April.

=== 28 March ===
List of shipwrecks: 28 March 1937
Ship	State	Description
Pilgrim	United States	The excursion steamer was destroyed by fire at Elizabethport, New Jersey.

=== 29 March ===
List of shipwrecks: 29 March 1937
Ship	State	Description
Mar Caspio	Spain	Spanish Civil War: The 3,080 GRT cargo ship on a passage from Newcastle to Bayonne with a cargo of coal, was shelled and damaged in the Bay of Biscay by two Nationalist naval trawlers off Capbreton, Landes, France. She was beached at the mouth of the Adour and later declared a total loss.

=== 30 March ===
List of shipwrecks: 30 March 1937
Ship	State	Description
Paraguay	Germany	The ship ran aground in the River Plate 90 nautical miles (170 km; 100 mi) upstream of Rio Grande do Norte, Brazil. Salvage efforts were abandoned on 7 April.

=== 31 March ===
List of shipwrecks: 31 March 1937
Ship	State	Description
Loch Morar	United Kingdom	The 125.7-foot (38.3 m), 277-ton steam trawler, a sold off Castle-class naval trawler, was lost with all 12 hands when she went on a reef 1,500 yards (1,400 m) off shore from Eyrarbakki, Iceland, in heavy weather.

=== Unknown date ===
List of shipwrecks: Unknown date March 1937
Ship	State	Description
Asnaes	Denmark	The cargo ship ran aground near Drogheda, County Louth, Ireland. She was refloated on 24 September.
Mar Cantabrico	Spain	Spanish Civil War: The cargo ship was shelled and sunk in the Bay of Biscay by Canarias (Spanish Navy). She was on a voyage from the United States to Spain with a cargo of war materials. Her crew were rescued by Canarias.

== April ==
=== 2 April ===
List of shipwrecks: 2 April 1937
Ship	State	Description
Poli	Greece	Spanish Civil War: The 2,861 GRT cargo ship on a passage from Bagnoli to Melilla in ballast was shelled and sunk by the Nationalist cruiser Baleares (Spanish Navy) in the Central Mediterranean, about 28 miles off Sant'Antioco.
Standale	United Kingdom	The 2,456 GRT cargo ship on a passage from Antwerp to Cartagena with a acargo of grain, foundered in the Atlantic Ocean, approximately 50 miles west of Porto. All 25 crew were rescued by Vandyck (United Kingdom).

=== 4 April ===
List of shipwrecks: 4 April 1937
Ship	State	Description
Alder	United Kingdom	The coaster was hit by Lady Cavan whilst anchored in Carlingford Lough and sank with the loss of six of her nine crew. Survivors were rescued by Lady Cavan.

=== 6 April ===
List of shipwrecks: 6 April 1937
Ship	State	Description
Andra	Panama	Spanish Civil War: The cargo ship was shelled and sunk by the Nationalist armed trawler Galerna (Spanish Navy) off Castro Urdiales.
Luigi Accame	Italy	The cargo ship ran aground at St. Catherine's Point, Isle of Wight, United Kingdom and was abandoned by her crew, who were rescued by the Yarmouth Lifeboat. She was refloated on 31 May.

=== 7 April ===
List of shipwrecks: 7 April 1937
Ship	State	Description
Lairdsmoor	United Kingdom	The cargo liner was in collision with Taranaki (United Kingdom) west of Portpatrick, Wigtownshire and sank with loss of two of the 38 people on board. Survivors were rescued by Taranaki.

=== 9 April ===
List of shipwrecks: 9 April 1937
Ship	State	Description
Ming Yue	China	The cargo ship sank in the Yangtze River 30 nautical miles (56 km) upstream of Ichang.

=== 10 April ===
List of shipwrecks: 10 April 1937
Ship	State	Description
Radiant	United States	The tug capsized and sank in the Delaware River at Chester, Pennsylvania with the loss of eight of the ten people on board.

=== 12 April ===
List of shipwrecks: 12 April 1937
Ship	State	Description
Broholm	Denmark	The cargo ship ran aground at Leixões, Portugal. She was refloated on 20 April.

=== 13 April ===
List of shipwrecks: 13 April 1937
Ship	State	Description
Island	Denmark	The 1,774 GRT cargo-passenger ship on a voyage from Copenhagen to Iceland with general cargo, ran aground on the Isle of May, Fife, United Kingdom. All 28 passengers on board were rescued by the Anstruther Lifeboat.
Rein	Norway	The 1,175 GRT cargo ship on a voyage from Lyngor to Preston with a cargo of wood pulp, ran aground at Helman Head, Caithness, United Kingdom. All sixteen crew were rescued by the fishing vessel Smiling Morn (United Kingdom).

=== 16 April ===
List of shipwrecks: 16 April 1937
Ship	State	Description
Duchesse de Brabant	Belgium	The 302 GRT steam trawler on her passage from fishing grounds to Ostend, ran aground in poor weather on Sumbø Holm near Suderø and subsequently sunk.

=== 23 April ===
List of shipwrecks: 23 April 1937
Ship	State	Description
Saint Martin	United States	During a voyage in the waters of the Territory of Alaska from Petersburg to Ketchikan with two people and no cargo on board, the 36-gross register ton, 55-foot (17 m) motor vessel was destroyed in Wrangell Narrows in the Alexander Archipelago in Southeast Alaska by a fire that began in her engine. There was no loss of life.

=== 24 April ===
List of shipwrecks: 24 April 1937
Ship	State	Description
Charles & Vernon	United Kingdom	The schooner was abandoned in the Atlantic Ocean off the Winter Quarter Lightship ( United States Lighthouse Service). Her crew was rescued by the motor vessel Lake Ormoc (United States).

=== 25 April ===
List of shipwrecks: 25 April 1937
Ship	State	Description
William R. Linn	United States	The cargo ship struck a submerged object in Lake Michigan and was beached at Detour, Michigan.

=== 26 April ===
List of shipwrecks: 26 April 1937
Ship	State	Description
C. B. Pedersen	Sweden	The four-masted barque collided with Chagres (United Kingdom) in the Atlantic Ocean 600 nautical miles (1,100 km) south east of the Azores, Portugal (35°46′N 35°48′W) and sank. All 32 crew were rescued by Chagres.

=== 28 April ===
List of shipwrecks: 28 April 1937
Ship	State	Description
Dalriada	United Kingdom	The passenger ship ran aground in the River Clyde at Dunure, Ayrshire in fog. All 700 passengers were put ashore using the ship's lifeboats. Dalriada later refloated and proceeded to Ayr.

=== 29 April ===
List of shipwrecks: 29 April 1937
Ship	State	Description
Macclesfield	United Kingdom	The cargo ship ran aground at Sunk Island, Yorkshire. She was refloated on 8 May.

=== 30 April ===
List of shipwrecks: 30 April 1937
Ship	State	Description
Clan Macwhirter	United Kingdom	The cargo ship arrived at Lourenço Marques, Portuguese East Africa, with her cargo on fire. She was beached whilst the fire was extinguished.
España	Spanish Navy	Spanish Civil War: The España-class battleship struck a mine at Santander, Cantabria, Spain, and then she was bombed by Gourdou-Leseurre GL-633 aircraft and sunk; those that survived were rescued by Velasco (Spanish Navy).
Golden Sun	United States	The cargo ship ran aground in the Yangtze at Chinkiang, China, she remained so for a number of days until she came free and departed China from Shanghai on 16 May.

== May ==
=== 1 May ===
List of shipwrecks: 1 May 1937
Ship	State	Description
Delphin IV	Germany	The coaster collided with Aenne (Germany) in the Kiel Canal and sank.

=== 2 May ===
List of shipwrecks: 2 May 1937
Ship	State	Description
Alecto	United Kingdom	The coaster collided in the North Sea (51°34′30″N 2°23′30″E) with Plavnik (Yugoslavia) and sank with the loss of ten of her fourteen crew. Survivors were rescued by Plavnik.
Ary Lensen	United Kingdom	The cargo ship ran aground in the Gulf of Smyrna (38°25′N 26°56′E). She was refloated on 7 May.

=== 3 May ===
List of shipwrecks: 3 May 1937
Ship	State	Description
Anna T	Greece	The cargo ship ran aground in the Charente at Tonnay-Charente, Charente-Maritime, France. She was refloated on 6 May.
Michalios	Greece	The cargo ship ran aground at Çanakkale, Turkey. She was refloated on 13 May.

=== 7 May ===
List of shipwrecks: 7 May 1937
Ship	State	Description
Javier Ouiroga	Spanish Navy	Spanish Civil War: The Candidio Perez-class motor torpedo boat was sunk in a collision near Gibraltar with Candidio Perez (Spanish Navy).

=== 8 May ===
List of shipwrecks: 8 May 1937
Ship	State	Description
Thetis	Germany	The cargo ship ran aground at Şile, Turkey.
Trinidad	United States	The coaster ran aground in Willapa Bay, Washington and broke up with the loss of one crew member.
Willesden	United Kingdom	The cargo ship collided with Gianfranco (Italy) in the English Channel off Dover, Kent during dense fog. She later collided with Thistleglen (United Kingdom) off Dungeness, Kent, was beached, was refloated the next day and towed to Dover.

=== 9 May ===
List of shipwrecks: 9 May 1937
Ship	State	Description
Aegeus	Greece	The cargo ship collided with Nashaba (United States) in the North Sea 32 nautical miles (59 km) south east of Bornholm, Denmark. The crew were rescued by Nashaba.

=== 10 May ===
List of shipwrecks: 10 May 1937
Ship	State	Description
Ekaterini Nicclaou	Greece	The cargo ship ran aground in the River Plate, Argentina. She was refloated on 23 May.

=== 12 May ===
List of shipwrecks: 12 May 1937
Ship	State	Description
Hermes	Germany	The tug collided with Lippe (Germany) in the Weser and sank with the loss of one crew member.
Standale	United Kingdom	The cargo ship foundered in the Atlantic Ocean off the Berlengas Islands, Portugal.

=== 13 May ===
List of shipwrecks: 13 May 1937
Ship	State	Description
Minmi	United Kingdom	The 1,508 GRT collier on a passage from Melbourne to Newcastle in ballast, ran aground on the Cape Banks, Sydney, New South Wales, Australia. She broke in three and sank with the loss of two crew.

=== 14 May ===
List of shipwrecks: 14 May 1937
Ship	State	Description
Leda	Sweden	The coaster collided with C. F. Tietgen (Denmark) in Øresund off Ven and sank with the loss of all three crew.
Wiegand	Germany	The cargo ship ran aground on the Carysfort Reef, Florida, United States. Her captain committed suicide. She was refloated the next day.

=== 15 May ===
List of shipwrecks: 15 May 1937
Ship	State	Description
Beatsa	United Kingdom	The 1,569 GRT cargo ship on a passages from Cartagena to Danzig with a cargo of oranges, ran aground off the Île-Moléne, Finistère, France and became a total loss.
Wandsbek	Germany	The cargo ship ran aground in the Bay of Biscay 6 nautical miles (11 km) off the Île Vierge Lighthouse. All crew were rescued by Sofia (Germany).

=== 16 May ===
List of shipwrecks: 16 May 1937
Ship	State	Description
Corrientes	United Kingdom	The cargo ship collided with Umtali (United Kingdom) in the River Thames at Greenhithe with the loss of a crew member. She was beached. She was refloated on 27 May.

=== 17 May ===
List of shipwrecks: 17 May 1937
Ship	State	Description
Port Edgar		The sealer ran aground on a reef off Speedwell Island, Falkland Islands and was wrecked.

=== 18 May ===
List of shipwrecks: 18 May 1937
Ship	State	Description
Monte Piana	Italy	A fire broke out in one of the cargo ship's holds after she departed Calcutta, India, bound for Genoa, Italy. It was brought under control and she returned to port.

=== 19 May ===
List of shipwrecks: 19 May 1937
Ship	State	Description
Legazpi	Spain	Spanish Civil War: The 4,349 GRT cargo ship on a passage from Marseille to Valencia, was bombed by Nationalist aircraft near Benicàssim and beached to prevent sinking. Refloated, taken to Sagunto for scrapping but bombed and sunk there.

=== 20 May ===
List of shipwrecks: 20 May 1937
Ship	State	Description
Houlburn Head	United Kingdom	The cargo ship collided with another vessel in the North Sea off the mouth of the Humber. She was beached at Immingham, Lincolnshire. She was refloated the next day and docked at Immingham.

=== 21 May ===
List of shipwrecks: 21 May 1937
Ship	State	Description
D 18	Spanish Navy	Spanish Civil War: The Basque auxiliary minesweeper was sunk in a collision with Ciscar (Spanish Navy).
Hai Yuan	China	The passenger ship ran aground in the Yangtze at the Kap Shuimun Pass. About 170 people were taken off by Yunnan (United Kingdom). She was refloated on 29 May.
Steinmetz	Germany	The tug capsized and sank at Rostock, Germany, whilst assisting Kaiser (Germany) with the loss of two of her crew.
Visurgis	Germany	The cargo ship collided with Siena (Italy) in the North Sea off the Terschelling Lightship (Netherlands) and sank.

=== 23 May ===
List of shipwrecks: 23 May 1937
Ship	State	Description
La Nièvre	France	The tanker came ashore at Audierne, Finistère. All crew were rescued.

=== 26 May ===
List of shipwrecks: 26 May 1937
Ship	State	Description
Itxas Alde	Spain	The cargo ship departed Bilbao bound for the Tees. No further trace, presumed foundered with the loss of all hands.
Mary Louise	United States	While standing on a cradle on the beach among cannery buildings and warehouses at Hidden Cove (54°57′N 130°21′W) in Southeast Alaska, the 19-gross register ton motor vessel was destroyed by a fire that spread to her from the buildings.

=== 28 May ===
List of shipwrecks: 28 May 1937
Ship	State	Description
Cadin	United Kingdom	Spanish Civil War: The cargo ship was bombed and sunk at Valencia with the loss of seven crew.

=== 29 May ===
List of shipwrecks: 29 May 1937
Ship	State	Description
Boscobel	United Kingdom	The 125.7-foot (38.3 m), 232 GRT coastal cargo ship, a former trawler, on a passage from Antwerp to London with a cargo of pig iron, or wuire fencing, struck a floating object in the North Sea and sank near the Lightship Wandelaar (51°21′N 02°50′W). All crew were rescued by the trawler Maurice Marguerite (Belgium).
Durour	United Kingdom	The 820 GRT inter-island steamer while undergoing repairs on a slipway at Kerabai, burned and was buried by debris following the explosion on the Vulcan Island.
Duris	United Kingdom	The 671 GRT inter-island steamer burned and was buried by debris following the explosion on the Vulcan Island.

=== 30 May ===
List of shipwrecks: 30 May 1937
Ship	State	Description
Ciudad de Barcelona	Spain	Spanish Civil War: The 3,946 GRT passenger-cargo ship on a passage from Marseille to Valencia with general cargo and 312 passengers, members of the International Brigades among them, was torpedoed and sunk by the Nationalist submarine General Sanjurjo (Spanish Navy) off Malgrat, Spain. 125 passengers and 56 crew were saved.

== June ==
=== 1 June ===
List of shipwrecks: 1 June 1937
Ship	State	Description
B.M. Co. No. 2	United States	Carrying a cargo of fishing gear, lumber, and oils, the 321-ton wooden barge was under tow from Anacortes, Washington, to Akhiok (also known as Alitak), Territory of Alaska, by the tug Georgia (United States) when her tow line broke during a gale with 75-mile-per-hour (121 km/h) winds. She drifted ashore on Hinchinbrook Island, 30 nautical miles (56 km; 35 mi) east of Cape Hinchinbrook, Territory of Alaska, and was wrecked, becoming a total loss. Some of her cargo was salvaged.

=== 5 June ===
List of shipwrecks: 5 June 1937
Ship	State	Description
Homefield	United Kingdom	The cargo ship collided at Calcutta, India with riverboat Palanpur (India). Both vessels were severely damaged and were beached.

=== 6 June ===
List of shipwrecks: 6 June 1937
Ship	State	Description
Glaisdale	United Kingdom	The cargo ship ran aground in the River Plate at Buenos Aires, Argentina. She was then hit by Alegrete (Brazil). Later refloated and proceeded to Buenos Aires.
Viena	Argentina	The passenger ship ran aground in the River Plate and was wrecked. All passengers and crew survived.

=== 7 June ===
List of shipwrecks: 7 June 1937
Ship	State	Description
Maria	Greece	The cargo ship caught fire in the Atlantic Ocean off Pernambuco, Brazil, the crew abandoned ship and were rescued by Westfalen (Germany).
Rau III	Germany	The whaler capsized and sank in the Weser, Germany, with the loss of twelve crew.

=== 8 June ===
List of shipwrecks: 8 June 1937
Ship	State	Description
Sami	Turkey	The cargo ship collided with Riva Ligure (Italy) in the Bosphorus and was severely damaged. She was beached to prevent her sinking.

=== 10 June ===
List of shipwrecks: 10 June 1937
Ship	State	Description
Joseph Augustus	United Kingdom	The Thames barge collided with Farfield (United Kingdom) in the River Thames at Dartford, Kent and sank.

=== 11 June ===
List of shipwrecks: 11 June 1937
Ship	State	Description
Faustino R. San Pedro	Spain	The cargo ship collided with Mari Amilia (Spain) off Comillas, Cantabria and sank with the loss of one crew member.
Golden Eagle	United Kingdom	The Thames barge collided with another vessel in the River Thames at Barking, Essex and sank. All crew were rescued.

=== 12 June ===
List of shipwrecks: 12 June 1937
Ship	State	Description
Planet	Germany	The cargo ship ran aground on Viel Island, Smyth Channel, Chile. She was refloated on 17 June.

=== 13 June ===
List of shipwrecks: 1 June 1937
Ship	State	Description
D 14	Spanish Navy	Spanish Civil War: The small Basque auxiliary minesweeper was sunk in an air raid at Portugalete.
D 20	Spanish Navy	Spanish Civil War: The small Basque auxiliary minesweeper was sunk in an air raid at Portugalete, a total loss.
D 24	Spanish Navy	Spanish Civil War: The small Basque auxiliary minesweeper was sunk in an air raid at Portugalete.
L 2	Spanish Navy	Spanish Civil War: The small Basque auxiliary minesweeping launch was sunk in an air raid at Portugalete.

=== 14 June ===
List of shipwrecks: 14 June 1937
Ship	State	Description
Delalba	United States	The cargo ship ran aground on the Feitceiras Reef, Argentina. She was refloated on 19 June.
Duke of Lancaster	United Kingdom	The passenger ferry ran aground at Bride, Isle of Man. She was refloated the following day.

=== 15 June ===
List of shipwrecks: 15 June 1937
Ship	State	Description
Bucephale	France	The passenger ship ran aground in the Sandwich Islands and was wrecked. All on board survived.
Hong Peng	United Kingdom	The cargo ship struck a mooring buoy at Swatow, China and was holed. She was beached. Hong Peng was refloated the next day.
Yunghun	China	The passenger ship ran aground and sank in the Yangtze at Ichang.

=== 16 June ===
List of shipwrecks: 16 June 1937
Ship	State	Description
Araba	Spanish Navy	Spanish Civil War: The Basque Navy auxiliary patrol ship was scuttled at Bilbao, Spain, to prevent capture upon the fall of the city to the Nationalists. Salvaged and put in Nationalist service as Alava.
Ayeta-Mendi	Spanish Navy	Spanish Civil War: The auxiliary patrol ship was lost.

=== 17 June ===
List of shipwrecks: 17 June 1937
Ship	State	Description
Jaime I	Spanish Navy	The España-class battleship was wrecked by an explosion and fire at the Spanish Navy's base at Cartagena, Spain, with the loss of at least 50 of her crew, for whom the government gave a state funeral. Later accounts placed the death toll at "at least 200". Declared beyond economical repair, she was scrapped in 1941.
Pauline E. Lohnes	United Kingdom	The schooner collided with Jean Jadot (Belgium) in the Atlantic Ocean (45°05′N 52°05′W) and sank. All crew were rescued by Jean Jadot.

=== 18 June ===
List of shipwrecks: 18 June 19367
Ship	State	Description
Falange	Spanish Navy	The Falange-class motor torpedo boat was sunk by accidental fire at Málaga.

=== 19 June ===
List of shipwrecks: 19 June 1937
Ship	State	Description
Bennekom	Netherlands	The cargo liner ran aground on the Negrillos Rocks, Buenaventura, Camagüey, Cuba. All passengers were taken off and landed at Buenaventura.
Gazteiz	Spanish Navy	Spanish Civil War: The Basque Navy auxiliary patrol ship was lost on this date.

=== 22 June ===
List of shipwrecks: 22 June 1937
Ship	State	Description
WTB Co. No. 7	United States	During a voyage in the Territory of Alaska from Appleton Cove to Olga Strait carrying a cargo of five tons of cans, crab traps, and rope, the 488-ton, 91-foot (28 m) scow was destroyed by fire in Olga Strait. The only person on board survived.

=== 25 June ===
List of shipwrecks: 25 June 1937
Ship	State	Description
Capo Pino	Italy	The cargo liner collided with Magallanes (Spain) in the Dardanelles and sank. All passengers and crew were rescued.

=== 26 June ===
List of shipwrecks: 26 June 1937
Ship	State	Description
Cabo Palos	Spain	Spanish Civil War: The cargo ship was torpedoed and sunk in the Mediterranean Sea with the loss of five of her 50 crew.
Kyno	United Kingdom	The cargo liner ran aground off Cape Norman, Newfoundland in fog. She was refloated on 6 July.
USS Sanderling	United States Navy	The Lapwing-class minesweeper sank at Pearl Harbor, Hawaii. She was declared a constructive total loss.
Sandgate Castle	United Kingdom	The cargo ship caught fire in the Atlantic Ocean (36°51′N 60°05′W) and was abandoned by her crew. All on board were rescued by President Pierce (United States) and USCGC Icarus ( United States Coast Guard).
Sonja	Sweden	The schooner was run down and sunk by Hermes (flag unknown) at Gothenburg.
Taxiarhis	Greece	The cargo ship foundered.

=== 29 June ===
List of shipwrecks: 29 June 1937
Ship	State	Description
Olga	Germany	The auxiliary schooner capsized at Riga, Latvia.

=== 30 June ===
List of shipwrecks: 30 June 1937
Ship	State	Description
Aranda	Norway	The cargo ship ran aground at Neil's Harbour, Nova Scotia, Canada. She was declared a total loss.
BK-72	Soviet Navy	Kanchazu Island incident: The K-class gunboat was shelled and sunk in the Amur River by Imperial Japanese Army artillery. Her captain and four crewmen killed. 6 of the 11 survivors wounded. The vessel was raised by the Empire of Japan, fate unknown.

=== Unknown date ===
List of shipwrecks: Unknown date 1937
Ship	State	Description
Aida Lauro	Italy	The cargo ship ran aground on Castle Rocks, St. Just, Cornwall, United Kingdom in dense fog. Fifteen crew saved, cargo written off.
Flamborough	United Kingdom	The 132.6-foot (40.4 m) trawler foundered sometime in June in an unknown location.
Maloa	United Kingdom	The coaster departed from Tampa, Florida, United States on 2 June bound for Belize. She caught fire and sank in the Atlantic Ocean off Cuba with the loss of all nine crew.

== July ==
=== 2 July ===
List of shipwrecks: 2 July 1937
Ship	State	Description
Carmine Filomena	Italy	The cargo ship ran aground on Lundy Island, Devon, United Kingdom. All crew were rescued. Salvage efforts were abandoned on 16 July.
Iris	France	The schooner ran aground at Roscoff, Finistère and was wrecked.
Sophia	Greece	The sailing ship was in collision with Hermes (Netherlands) at Thessaloniki and sank.
Themoni	Greece	The cargo ship caught fire in the Atlantic Ocean 120 nautical miles (220 km) north of Fernando de Noronha, Brazil. She was escorted to the island by Royal Star (United Kingdom) and beached on 3 July. She was declared a total loss, but was refloated on 24 August.

=== 3 July ===
List of shipwrecks: 3 July 1937
Ship	State	Description
Ronsan Maru	Japan	The cargo ship ran aground on Palaui Island, Philippines. She was refloated on 10 July.

=== 4 July ===
List of shipwrecks: 4 July 1937
Ship	State	Description
Babe	United States	The 45-foot (14 m) schooner-rigged fishing smack ran aground on a bar and capsized in East Pass, Destin, Florida. One man, two children, and three women, one the captain's wife, drowned.
Excelda	United Kingdom	The schooner was wrecked in Confusion Bay, Newfoundland.
Uga Maru	Japan	The cargo ship ran aground near the Nojimazaki Lighthouse. She was refloated on 9 July.

=== 8 July ===
List of shipwrecks: 8 July 1937
Ship	State	Description
Pindos	Greece	The cargo ship was rammed and holed at Dakar, French West Africa by Perthshire (United Kingdom). She was beached, and was refloated on 12 July.

=== 9 July ===
List of shipwrecks: 9 July 1937
Ship	State	Description
West Mahwah	United States	The cargo ship ran aground at Pescadero, California. She was refloated on 12 July.

=== 11 July ===
List of shipwrecks: 11 July 1937
Ship	State	Description
Margaret	United States	The 9-net register ton motor vessel caught fire after an explosion that occurred while she was filling one of her fuel tanks with gasoline at a dock at Ketchikan, Territory of Alaska. With the fire out of control, she was towed away from the dock and beached on Pennock Island, where she sank in 10 to 15 feet (3.0 to 4.6 m) of water, a total loss. Her crew of five survived.

=== 12 July ===
List of shipwrecks: 12 July 1937
Ship	State	Description
Lies	Netherlands	The coaster was in collision with Gauss (Germany) at Bremen, Germany and sank. She was raised the next day.

=== 13 July ===
List of shipwrecks: 13 July 1937
Ship	State	Description
Gard	Norway	The cargo ship ran aground on Cerebus Rock, Strait of Canso. She was abandoned on 15 July, all crew were rescued.
Messapia	Italy	The cargo ship foundered in the Danube at Brăila, Romania after her cargo shifted. She was declared a constructive total loss.
Nellie	Belgium	The coaster stranded on Lundy Island, Devon, United Kingdom on 7 July. She was refloated the next day but capsized and sank. All ten crew were rescued by Ranger (United Kingdom).

=== 14 July ===
List of shipwrecks: 14 July 1937
Ship	State	Description
Southern Prince	United Kingdom	The ocean liner collided with Elstree Grange (United Kingdom) in the River Plate, Argentina. She was beached and 52 passengers were taken off by Armada de la República Argentina boats. She was refloated on 19 July.

=== 15 July ===
List of shipwrecks: 15 July 1937
Ship	State	Description
Mexico	Mexico	The cargo ship ran aground at Tampico, Florida, United States and was a total loss.

=== 16 July ===
List of shipwrecks: 16 July 1937
Ship	State	Description
Alten	United States	The 43-net register ton halibut-fishing boat collided with the heavy cruiser USS Louisville (United States Navy) in the harbor at Ketchikan, Territory of Alaska. Louisville and the cutter USCGC Cyane ( United States Coast Guard) assisted her crew of 11 and there was no loss of life, but Alten was so badly damaged that she was a constructive total loss.
Elliniki Dimokratia	Greece	The coaster sank in the Mediterranean Sea whilst on a voyage from Chekka to Beirut, Lebanon with the loss of two of her five crew.

=== 17 July ===
List of shipwrecks: 17 July 1937
Ship	State	Description
Captain Bud	United States	The tug was gutted by fire at New Orleans, Louisiana.

=== 18 July ===
List of shipwrecks: 18 July 1937
Ship	State	Description
Nicolaou Ourania	Greece	The cargo ship ran aground in the Paraná River, Argentina. She was refloated on 31 July.
Skaraborg	Sweden	The cargo ship collided with Hermia (Germany) in the River Thames at Gravesend, Kent, United Kingdom and was beached.

=== 20 July ===
List of shipwrecks: 20 July 1937
Ship	State	Description
USS Sproston	United States Navy	The decommissioned Wickes-class destroyer was sunk as a target.

=== 21 July ===
List of shipwrecks: 21 July 1937
Ship	State	Description
Havso	Norway	The cargo ship struck rocks and foundered in the Irish Sea off Rhoscolyn Head, Anglesey, United Kingdom. All sixteen crew survived.

=== 22 July ===
List of shipwrecks: 22 July 1937
Ship	State	Description
USS Anthony	United States Navy	The decommissioned Wickes-class light minelayer was sunk as a target in the Pacific Ocean off California.

=== 24 July ===
List of shipwrecks: 24 July 1937
Ship	State	Description
Rolfe	United States	The 38-gross register ton, 55.9-foot (17.0 m) fishing vessel was wrecked on Black Sand Island (59°25′15″N 139°29′30″W) in Ahrnklin Inlet at the entrance to the Ahrnklin River on the south-central coast of the Territory of Alaska. The two people on board survived.

=== 27 July ===
List of shipwrecks: 27 July 1937
Ship	State	Description
Zeantunes	Brazil	The cargo ship caught fire and sank.

=== 29 July ===
List of shipwrecks: 29 July 1937
Ship	State	Description
Andutz Mendi	Spain	Spanish Civil War: The 1,601 GRT cargo ship on a passage from Barcelona to Marseille as part of a small convoy with two Campsa tankers, was machine gunned, shelled, and put ablaze in the Mediterranean Sea off Le Grau-du-Roi, Gard by two submarines (one of them being General Sanjurjo (Spanish Navy)) with the loss of twenty of her 34 crew. Three survivors were rescued by a French fishing vessel. The freighter took refuge in French territorial waters, and was able to reach Barcelona and put back into service. She was bombed and sunk there by Italian bombers in January 1939, later refloated by the Nationalists and renamed Monte Buitre.
Hai Yen	Republic of China Navy	Second Sino-Japanese War: The Hai Yen-class river gunboat was sunk in Canton, China by Japanese aircraft.

=== 30 July ===
List of shipwrecks: 30 July 1937
Ship	State	Description
Num. 41	Spanish Navy	Spanish Civil War: The Num. 11-class motor torpedo boat was sunk by Nationalist Heinkel He 59 aircraft.

== August ==
=== 1 August ===
List of shipwrecks: 1 August 1937
Ship	State	Description
Essex Manor	United Kingdom	The cargo ship ran aground at Cape Yerimozaki, Japan and was declared a total loss. She was refloated on 19 August.

=== 2 August ===
List of shipwrecks: 2 August 1937
Ship	State	Description
Anastassis	Greece	The auxiliary sailing vessel collided with Hydra (Greece) at Piraeus and sank with an unknown number of casualties.

=== 3 August ===
List of shipwrecks: 3 August 1937
Ship	State	Description
Tijerberg	United Kingdom	The whaler was wrecked in Saldanha Bay, South Africa.

=== 5 August ===
List of shipwrecks: 5 August 1937
Ship	State	Description
Maaskerk	Netherlands	The cargo liner struck the Brenton Rock, Cape Palmas, Liberia and was beached at 4°22′20″N 7°44′40″W. All passengers were disembarked. She was refloated on 7 August.

=== 7 August ===
List of shipwrecks: 7 August 1937
Ship	State	Description
British Corporal	United Kingdom	Spanish Civil War: The tanker was attacked off Algeria by Nationalist aircraft and was damaged.
Mongioia	Italy	Spanish Civil War: The cargo ship was attacked by Nationalist aircraft off Algeria with the loss of one crew member.

=== 8 August ===
List of shipwrecks: 8 August 1937
Ship	State	Description
Bonita	United States	While docked at Chignik, Territory of Alaska, the 14-gross register ton fishing vessel suffered an engine room explosion that set her on fire. After the fire went out of control, she was towed out into Chignik Bay (56.2956°N 158.4015°W), where she burned until she sank about 3 nautical miles (5.6 km; 3.5 mi) offshore. One of her five crewmembers was injured.
Djebel Amour	France	Spanish Civil War: The cargo ship was attacked by Nationalist aircraft off Algeria.
Hu Ying	Republic of China Navy	Second Sino-Japanese War: Japanese aircraft sank the torpedo boat in the Yangtze.
K Ktistakis	Greece	Spanish Civil War: The cargo ship was attacked by Nationalist aircraft off Algeria.
Princess Marie Jose	Belgium	The cargo ship collided with Clan Macneil (United Kingdom) in the North Sea off Dunkirk, Nord, France and was beached there. She was refloated on 10 August.

=== 9 August ===
List of shipwrecks: 9 August 1937
Ship	State	Description
Nereus	Greece	The cargo ship ran aground at Cape Beale, British Columbia, Canada and was wrecked.

=== 10 August ===
List of shipwrecks: 10 August 1937
Ship	State	Description
Atlantic	United States	After dragging her anchors during a gale, the 14-ton purse seiner was wrecked in Little Pybus Bay (57°12′45″N 134°05′05″W) on the northwest coast of Spruce Island in Frederick Sound in the Alexander Archipelago in Southeast Alaska. Her crew of five survived and her gasoline engine was salvaged, but otherwise she was a total loss.
Kebco	United States	The tug was in collision with the steamer Sandcraft (United States) at Chicago, Illinois, and sank.

=== 11 August ===
List of shipwrecks: 11 August 1937
Ship	State	Description
Campeador	Spain	Spanish Civil War: The tanker was torpedoed and sunk by Saetta (Regia Marina) off Tunis, French protectorate of Tunisia (36°55′N 11°15′E). There were twelve casualties amongst her 42 crew. Some of the survivors were rescued by Dido and Clintonia (both United Kingdom).
Chu Chien	Republic of China Navy	Second Sino-Japanese War: The Chu Yu-class gunboat was scuttled in the Yangtze.
Hai Chen or Hai Tan	Republic of China Navy	Second Sino-Japanese War: The decommissioned Hai Yung-class protected cruiser, named either Hai Chen or Hai Tan (sources disagree), was scuttled in the Yangtze as a blockship.
Hai Chi	Republic of China Navy	Second Sino-Japanese War: The Hai Chi-class protected cruiser was scuttled in the Yangtze at Jiangyin as a blockship.
Hai Chou	Republic of China Navy	Second Sino-Japanese War: The decommissioned Hai Yung-class protected cruiser was scuttled in the Yangtze as a blockship.
Hai Yung	Republic of China Navy	Second Sino-Japanese War: The decommissioned Hai Yung-class protected cruiser was scuttled in the Yangtze as a blockship.
No. 2 Chen Tse	Republic of China Navy	Second Sino-Japanese War: The Chen Tse-class torpedo boat was scuttled in the Yangtze at Kiangyin, China as a blockship.
No. 4 Su Tse	Republic of China Navy	Second Sino-Japanese War: The Chen Tse-class torpedo boat was scuttled in the Yangtze at Kiangyin, China as a blockship.
Ta Tung	Republic of China Navy	Second Sino-Japanese War: The Chien Wei-class torpedo gunboat was scuttled in the Yangtze as a blockship.
Taku II	United States	While taking on fuel at the Standard Oil of California dock at Ketchikan, Territory of Alaska, the 14-gross register ton, 52-foot (15.8 m) gasoline-powered motor vessel suffered an explosion and was destroyed by an ensuing fire. One man was injured in the explosion; he survived.
Tse Chion (or Tze Chiang)	Republic of China Navy	Second Sino-Japanese War: The Chien Wei-class torpedo gunboat was scuttled in the Yangtze as a blockship.
Tung Chi	Republic of China Navy	Second Sino-Japanese War: The training ship, a former Tung Chi-class unprotected cruiser, was scuttled in the Yangtze as a blockship.
Unknown	Republic of China	Second Sino-Japanese War: Twenty merchant ships and eight barges were scuttled and sunk in the river as blockships.

=== 12 August ===
List of shipwrecks: 12 August 1937
Ship	State	Description
Helouan	Italy	The hospital ship caught fire at Naples, Campania, Italy. She was taken outside the harbour and scuttled.
Maine	Denmark	The cargo ship collided with RMS Duchess of Atholl (United Kingdom) in the Atlantic Ocean (41°37′N 66°50′W). She was taken in tow but foundered with the entire crew rescued by Duchess of Atholl.

=== 13 August ===
List of shipwrecks: 13 August 1937
Ship	State	Description
Conde de Abásolo	Spain	Spanish Civil War: The cargo ship was torpedoed and sunk in the Mediterranean Sea off Cape Bon, Tunisia by the Italian destroyer Ostro (Regia Marina).
Uko Maru No.1	Japan	The ferry collided with the cargo ship Kiyokawa Maru (Japan) at Kobe and sank. Kiyokawa Maru was beached but later refloated undamaged.

=== 14 August ===
List of shipwrecks: 14 August 1937
Ship	State	Description
D 17	Spanish Navy	Spanish Civil War: The small Basque auxiliary minesweeper was sunk by accident in the Cantabrian Sea.
Edith	Denmark	Spanish Civil War: The cargo ship was bombed and sunk in the Mediterranean Sea 15 nautical miles (28 km) off Villa Nueva Geltru. All crew survived.
Geo. W. McKnight	Panama	Spanish Civil War: The tanker was shelled and set on fire 20 nautical miles (37 km) north west of Cape Bon, Tunisia by two torpedo boats. She was abandoned, all 38 crew were rescued by British Commodore (United Kingdom), which took the ship in tow.

=== 15 August ===
List of shipwrecks: 15 August 1937
Ship	State	Description
Ciudad de Cadiz	Spain	Spanish Civil War: The cargo ship was torpedoed and sunk in the Aegean Sea 15 nautical miles (28 km) off Tenedos, Turkey by a Nationalist submarine. All crew were rescued by a Soviet merchant ship.

=== 16 August ===
List of shipwrecks: 16 August 1937
Ship	State	Description
SHI-102	Republic of China Navy	Second Sino-Japanese War: The coastal motor boat was crippled during an attack on the cruiser Izumo (Imperial Japanese Navy) and was scuttled in the Huangpu River.

=== 17 August ===
List of shipwrecks: 17 August 1937
Ship	State	Description
Little Glory	United States	During a voyage from Naknek to King Cove, Territory of Alaska, the 50-gross register ton motor vessel ran aground in St. Catherine's Cove (55°01′N 163°30′W) in False Pass in the Aleutian Islands and was pounded to pieces by the surf. Her crew of nine survived.
North Dakota	United States	The 18-gross register ton, 41.5-foot (12.6 m) motor cargo vessel sank 12 nautical miles (22 km; 14 mi) northwest of Barren Island (54°44′45″N 131°20′30″W) in Southeast Alaska. All four people on board survived.

=== 18 August ===
List of shipwrecks: 18 August 1937
Ship	State	Description
An Kong	China	The cargo ship ran aground in the Yangtze at Haichow. She was refloated on 24 August.
Armuru	Spain	Spanish Civil War: The cargo ship was torpedoed and damaged in the Aegean Sea off Tenedos, Turkey by a Nationalist submarine Ferraris. She was beached, but was a constructive total loss. All crew survived.
China Trader	China	Second Sino-Japanese War: Sunk as a blockship in the Yangtze.
Possidon	Greece	The cargo ship collided with Yssel (Netherlands) at Hook of Holland, South Holland, Netherlands. She sank the next day due to damage received. Refloated on 25 August.

=== 25 August ===
List of shipwrecks: 25 August 1937
Ship	State	Description
Con	Spanish Navy	Spanish Civil War: The naval trawler was shelled and sunk by José Luis Díez (Spanish Navy).
San Fausto	Spanish Navy	Spanish Civil War: The naval trawler was shelled and sunk by José Luis Díez (Spanish Navy).
Yung Chien	Republic of China Navy	Second Sino-Japanese War: The Yung Chien-class gunboat was sunk by Japanese aircraft on the Yangtze while she was under repair at a shipyard in Kiangnan, China. She was captured by the Japanese in November 1937; they refloated and repaired her and placed in her service on 25 October 1938 as the depot ship Asuka (Imperial Japanese Navy).

=== 26 August ===
List of shipwrecks: 26 August 1937
Ship	State	Description
Cantabria	Spain	The ship came ashore at Lacanau, Gironde, France. All 500 passengers and crew were rescued.
Chi Jih	Republic of China Navy	Second Sino-Japanese War: The survey ship, a former gunboat, was sunk by Imperial Japanese Navy destroyers on the Yangtze near Suzhou, China.
Gazteiz	Spanish Republican Navy	Spanish Civil War: The Basque Navy auxiliary patrol ship was lost on this date.

=== 27 August ===
List of shipwrecks: 27 August 1937
Ship	State	Description
African Trader	United Kingdom	The cargo ship was bombed and damaged at Gijón, Asturias, Spain by Nationalist aircraft. She was beached at Sablanceau, Charente-Maritime, France.

=== 28 August ===
List of shipwrecks: 28 August 1937
Ship	State	Description
Taimi	Finland	The auxiliary three-masted schooner caught fire in the Baltic Sea west of Trelleborg, Skåne County, Sweden and was severely damaged. All crew were rescued, the ship was towed into Trelleborg.

=== 29 August ===
List of shipwrecks: 29 August 1937
Ship	State	Description
Rayford	United Kingdom	The coaster collided in the North Sea off the mouth of the Humber with London (United Kingdom). She was taken in tow but sank; entire crew were rescued.

=== 30 August ===
List of shipwrecks: 30 August 1937
Ship	State	Description
Gyuri	Panama	The cargo ship caught fire at Marseille, Bouches-du-Rhône, France. She was beached at the entrance to the port and abandoned by her crew.
Silo	Sweden	The auxiliary schooner sank off Landskrona, Skåne County. All crew survived.

=== 31 August ===
List of shipwrecks: 31 August 1937
Ship	State	Description
Timiryazev	Soviet Union	Spanish Civil War: The cargo ship was torpedoed and sunk by Turbine (Regia Marina) off Tunis, Tunisia. All 29 crew survived.

=== Unknown date ===
List of shipwrecks: Unknown date 1937
Ship	State	Description
Wu Feng	Republic of China Navy	Second Sino-Japanese War: The Wu Feng-class gunboat was scuttled in the Yangtze at Kiangyin, China, as a blockship on 11 August 1937, or sunk at Canton, China by aircraft from Ryūjō and Hōshō (both Imperial Japanese Navy) on 29 September 1937.
Yung Chi	China	Second Sino-Japanese War: Sunk as a blockship in the Yangtze.

== September ==
=== 1 September ===
List of shipwrecks: 1 September 1937
Ship	State	Description
Cedros	Mexico	The cargo ship collided with Hidalgo (Mexico) off Ensenada, Baja California and sank.
Tarpon	United States	The cargo steamer foundered in high seas in the Gulf of Mexico 7.8 nautical miles (14.4 km) off Panama City, Florida, with the loss of 25 of the 25 crew.
Urana	United Kingdom	The coaster ran aground at the mouth of the River Manning, New South Wales, Australia. She broke in two and was a total loss.
Woodford	Greece/United Kingdom	Spanish Civil War: The ship was torpedoed and sunk by the Italian submarine Diaspro (Regia Marina) with the loss of one crew member. At the time of sinking still was under Greek registry.

=== 2 September ===
List of shipwrecks: 2 September 1937
Ship	State	Description
An Lee	China	The coaster broke free from her moorings at Hong Kong in a typhoon. She collided with HMS Diamond, HMS Duchess and HMS Suffolk (all Royal Navy) before coming ashore. She was refloated on 28 December.
Asama Maru	Japan	The ocean liner was driven aground at Junk Bay, Hong Kong in a typhoon. She was refloated on 12 March 1938 and towed to Nagasaki, Japan for repairs.
Blagoev	Soviet Union	Spanish Civil War: The cargo ship was torpedoed and sunk in the Aegean Sea 15 nautical miles (28 km) off Skyros, Greece by the Italian submarine Luigi Settembrini (Regia Marina) with the loss of one crew member.
Bonneville	Unknown	The ship was driven aground at Hong Kong in a typhoon.
Conte Verde	Italy	The ocean liner was driven ashore at Hong Kong in a typhoon and was severely damaged. She was refloated on 22 September.
Cormorant	Italy	The salvage vessel sank at Hong Kong in a typhoon.
HMS Cornflower	Royal Navy	The training ship, a former Arabis-class sloop, was driven ashore at Hong Kong in a typhoon.
Dahun	Unknown	The ship was driven aground at Hong Kong in a typhoon.
Da Shing	China	The cargo ship was driven ashore at Hong Kong in a typhoon. She was refloated on 17 January 1938.
Emmy	Greece	The cargo ship was driven aground at Hong Kong in a typhoon and was severely damaged. She was refloated on 16 September.
Englee	China	The cargo ship was driven ashore at Hong Kong in a typhoon. She was refloated on 23 November.
Fenglee	China	The cargo ship was driven ashore at Hong Kong in a typhoon. She was refloated on 23 November.
Gertrude Maersk	Denmark	The cargo ship was driven ashore at Hong Kong in a typhoon. She was refloated on 4 September.
Hunan	United Kingdom	The cargo ship was driven ashore at Peangchau Island, Hong Kong in a typhoon. She was refloated on 4 November.
Hsin Ping	China	The cargo ship was driven ashore at Lantau Island, Hong Kong (22°19′N 114°02′E) in a typhoon.
Kalgan	United Kingdom	The passenger ship was driven ashore at Hong Kong in a typhoon. She was refloated on 4 September.
Kausing	United Kingdom	The tug was driven ashore on Green Island, Hong Kong in a typhoon.
Kwangchow	United Kingdom	The passenger ship was driven ashore at Hong Kong in a typhoon. She was abandoned by her crew as salvage prospects were stated to be poor and was declared a constructive total loss.
Lu Hsing	China	The cargo ship was driven ashore at Hong Kong in a typhoon. She was refloated on 17 October.
Lycemoon	United Kingdom	The passenger ship was driven ashore at Hong Kong in a typhoon. She was refloated on 4 September.
Mao Lee	China	The cargo ship sank at Hong Kong in a typhoon. She was refloated on 31 December.
On Lee	China	The cargo ship was driven ashore on the Praya, Hong Kong.
Perola	Portugal	The passenger ship sank at Hong Kong in a typhoon with the loss of two crew members. She was refloated on 14 September.
Produce	Norway	The cargo ship was driven ashore at Hong Kong in a typhoon. She was refloated on 4 September.
Shenandoah	Unknown	The ship was driven aground at Hong Kong in a typhoon.
Sheng Lee	China	The cargo ship was driven ashore at Hong Kong in a typhoon.
Shuntien	United Kingdom	The cargo ship was driven ashore at Hong Kong in a typhoon. She was refloated the next day.
Talamba	United Kingdom	The cargo ship, chartered by the Chinese government, was driven ashore in a typhoon at Hong Kong. She was refloated on 23 November.
Teh Hsing	China	The cargo ship sank at Hong Kong in a typhoon. She was refloated on 4 September.
Tymeric	United Kingdom	The cargo ship was driven ashore at Quarry Bay, Hong Kong in a typhoon.
Unknown	Unknown	1937 Hong Kong typhoon:40 Junks sunk at sea. Estimated 450 died, 5 rescued.
Van Heutsz	Netherlands	The passenger ship was driven ashore at Green Island, Hong Kong in a typhoon. She was refloated on 10 September.
Yuet On	China	The passenger ship sank at Hong Kong in a typhoon.
Yun Mow	China	The cargo ship was driven ashore at Hong Kong in a typhoon.

=== 7 September ===
List of shipwrecks: 7 September 1937
Ship	State	Description
Salamis	Greece	The cargo ship ran aground on the Rabbit Islands, Çanakkale, Turkey.
Shell Spark	United Kingdom	The coastal tanker collided with pleasure steamer Kingswood (United Kingdom) in the River Thames near Wandsworth Bridge, London and sank. Both crew were rescued.

=== 9 September ===
List of shipwrecks: 9 September 1937
Ship	State	Description
Elbing IV	Germany	The cargo ship sprang a leak at Amsterdam, Netherlands and was beached.
K T	United States	The 8-gross register ton troller was wrecked on Lazaria Island in Sitka Sound in Southeast Alaska after she became disabled in high winds when a line fouled her propeller. The only person aboard survived.
Kodiak	United States	The 16-gross register ton motor vessel caught fire at the entrance to Womens Bay (57°43′N 152°31′W) on the coast of Kodiak Island in the Territory of Alaska, after her gasoline engine backfired, igniting her gasoline tanks and bilges. A skiff towed her to the beach, where the fire and the explosion of the gasoline tanks at her stern completely destroyed her. Her crew of three survived.

=== 11 September ===
List of shipwrecks: 11 September 1937
Ship	State	Description
G.L. 78	United States	The 50-foot (15.2 m) barge sank in 65 feet (20 m) of water in the North Atlantic Ocean off Sandy Hook, New Jersey, at 40°18.834′N 073°53.094′W.
Malachace	United States	The cargo ship sprang a leak and was beached at Baton Rouge, Louisiana.
Sophie	flag unknown	The dredger sank in the Atlantic Ocean (39°45′N 10°20′W) whilst under tow by Donau (Netherlands).

=== 13 September ===
List of shipwrecks: 13 September 1938
Ship	State	Description
T-2	Spanish Navy	Spanish Civil War: The T-1-class torpedo boat was wrecked at Santander, Spain, possibly during a submarine attack.

=== 15 September ===
List of shipwrecks: 15 September 1937
Ship	State	Description
Coral Spray	United Kingdom	The schooner was wrecked at St. Shott's, Newfoundland with the loss of one crew member.
Jean	United States	The 8-gross register ton fishing vessel was destroyed at Six Mile Point (56°20′N 132°00′W) in Blake Channel in Southeast Alaska by an explosion that occurred when the bottom of her gasoline tank fell out and a subsequent fire. Her crew of two was rescued by the vessel 31B470 (United States).
Shinko Maru	Japan	The cargo ship ran aground at Tadotsu, Kagawa. She was refloated on 15 October.
Taurus	United States	The tug sank off the Pooles Island Lighthouse, Maryland.

=== 16 September ===
List of shipwrecks: 16 September 1937
Ship	State	Description
Marionga J. Cairi	Greece	The cargo ship collided with Athina Livanos (Greece) off the Chico Bank, Argentina and was beached.
Shi 102	Republic of China Navy	Second Sino-Japanese War: The Shi 34-class motor torpedo boat was lost.

=== 17 September ===
List of shipwrecks: 17 September 1937
Ship	State	Description
Ming Tao	China	The cargo ship sank in the Yangtze.
Sakae Maru No.7	Japan	The cargo ship foundered in the East China Sea south of Korea.

=== 18 September ===
List of shipwrecks: 18 September 1937
Ship	State	Description
Alderpoint	United Kingdom	The cargo ship ran aground at Saint Pierre Island, Miquelon and sank. All crew were rescued.
J A Maclean	United Kingdom	The coaster foundered off Peckford's Island, Fogo, Newfoundland. All crew were rescued.

=== 20 September ===
List of shipwrecks: 20 September 1937
Ship	State	Description
C. E. Redfern	United States	The cargo ship sprang a leak and foundered in Lake Michigan off Frankfort, Michigan. All crew were rescued.
Gilly	United Kingdom	The coaster was wrecked at Doddridge, Ontario, Canada.

=== 21 September ===
List of shipwrecks: 21 September 1937
Ship	State	Description
Cap Arcona	Germany	The ocean liner ran aground in the River Plate, Argentina. She was refloated two days later.
Tencho Maru	Japan	The cargo ship ran aground at Shiogama.

=== 22 September ===
List of shipwrecks: 22 September 1937
Ship	State	Description
Alexanderina	United Kingdom	The salvage vessel sank at Longhope, Orkney.
Mount Pindus	Greece	The cargo ship was struck by Corcovado (Brazil) at Santos, São Paulo, was holed and was beached.
Nahoon	United Kingdom	The coaster ran aground at Kommetjie, Cape Town, South Africa. She was refloated the next day but was severely damaged.

=== 23 September ===
List of shipwrecks: 23 September 1937
Ship	State	Description
Honora Evelyn	United Kingdom	The 87.7-foot (26.7 m), 100-ton salvage ship, a former steam drifter, was wrecked on rocks at Dunfanaghy, County Donegal, Ireland, while attempting salvage of the trawler Dinas (United Kingdom) that wrecked the previous year, a total loss.
Ping Hai	Republic of China Navy	Second Sino-Japanese War: The Ning Hai-class light cruiser was bombed and sunk in shallow water in the Yangtze near Koin, China by Japanese aircraft. Five crew were killed, with 50 wounded. The Japanese refloated on 2 March 1938, taken to Shanhai, then to Sasebo where she was laid up for five years. She was commissioned into service as Ioshima (Imperial Japanese Navy).

=== 24 September ===
List of shipwrecks: 24 September 1937
Ship	State	Description
Clan Alpine	United Kingdom	The cargo ship ran aground at Hansweert, Zeeland, Netherlands. She was refloated later that day.
Pudeto	Chile	The cargo liner caught fire off Atico, Caravelí, Peru. All passengers were rescued by Santa Lucia (United States). Pudeto sank on 9 October.

=== 25 September ===
List of shipwrecks: 25 September 1937
Ship	State	Description
Chao Ho	Republic of China Navy	Second Sino-Japanese War: The hulk of the old cruiser was scuttled in the Pearl River at Humen.
Hai Chen	Republic of China Navy	Second Sino-Japanese War: The cruiser was scuttled in the Yangtze.
Hai Chi	Republic of China Navy	Second Sino-Japanese War: The cruiser was scuttled in the Yangtze.
Hai Chou	Republic of China Navy	Second Sino-Japanese War: The cruiser was scuttled in the Yangtze.
Hai Rong	Republic of China Navy	Second Sino-Japanese War: The cruiser was scuttled in the Yangtze.
Neebing	United Kingdom	The cargo ship sank in Lake Superior with the loss of five crew.
Ning Hai	Republic of China Navy	Second Sino-Japanese War: The Ning Hai-class light cruiser was sunk in shallow water in the Yangtze near Bawei Harbor by Japanese aircraft. The Japanese refloated her on 5 May 1938. She was taken to Shanghai for temporary repairs then steamed to Aioi, Japan for permanent repairs. She was laid up for five years, then commissioned into service as Yasoshima (Imperial Japanese Navy).
Yat Sen	Republic of China Navy	Second Sino-Japanese War: The gunboat (a.k.a. Yi Hsien) was beached at Nanking, China, and rolled onto her port side after suffering damage in Japanese air attacks. 14 crew were killed and 8 wounded. The Japanese captured, refloated, and repaired her and commissioned her into service as the training ship Atada (Imperial Japanese Navy).

=== 26 September ===
List of shipwrecks: 65 September 1937
Ship	State	Description
Chiang Li	Republic of China Navy	Second Sino-Japanese War: The gunboat was sunk off Qingdao, China.
Chiang Tai	Republic of China Navy	Second Sino-Japanese War: The Chiang Kung-class gunboat was sunk by Japanese aircraft in the South China Sea off the coast of Kwangtung, China.
Hai Ku	Republic of China Navy	Second Sino-Japanese War: The Hai Ku-class patrol craft was sunk at Guangzhou, China.
Tung An	Republic of China Navy	Second Sino-Japanese War: The Fu Po-class destroyer was scuttled at Qingdao, China.
Yung Hsiang	Republic of China Navy	Second Sino-Japanese War: The Yung Feng-class gunboat was scuttled at Qingdao, China. She was refloated and repaired by the Japanese and placed in Imperial Japanese Navy service, then was returned to the Republic of China in 1945.

=== 27 September ===
List of shipwrecks: 27 September 1937
Ship	State	Description
Bedale H	United Kingdom	The cargo ship collided with Elizabeth Lensen (flag unknown) in the North Sea off Grangemouth, Stirlingshire and was beached.
Chien Kang	Republic of China Navy	Second Sino-Japanese War: Japanese aircraft sank the Fu Po-class destroyer in the Yangtze at Chiangyin, China. The Japanese refloated and repaired her and placed her in service as Yamasemi (Imperial Japanese Navy).
Consul Cords	Germany	The cargo ship ran aground on Saaremaa, Estonia. She was refloated on 30 September.
Lackenby	United Kingdom	The cargo ship ran aground on Bell Island, Newfoundland. She was refloated on 14 October.

=== 28 September ===
List of shipwrecks: 28 September 1937
Ship	State	Description
Catalina	Portugal	The passenger ship collided with Norma (Norway) in the Bay of Biscay 40 nautical miles (74 km) north west of Ouessant, Finistère, France. She was abandoned by her crew, who were rescued by Abeille No.22 (France), which took the ship in tow.

=== 29 September ===
List of shipwrecks: 29 September 1937
Ship	State	Description
Chu Yiu	Republic of China Navy	Second Sino-Japanese War: The Chu Yu-class gunboat was bombed and sunk at Jiangyin.
Limit	United States	The 50-gross register ton purse seiner and her crew of eight men disappeared in the vicinity of Baranof Island and Chatham Strait in the Alexander Archipelago in Southeast Alaska sometime during the night of 28–29 September. Searchers found only a few pieces of floating wreckage from the vessel.
Myrna	United States	The 11-gross register ton, 34.4-foot (10.5 m) fishing vessel was destroyed by fire at Wrangell, Territory of Alaska. All three people on board survived.
Shi 34	Republic of China Navy	Second Sino-Japanese War: The Shi 34-class motor torpedo boat was lost on this date.
Victory II	United States (Philippines)	The Japanese owned 40-ton fishing fleet tender was sunk in a collision, while at anchor, with Kajang (Straits Settlements) near Sandakan, British North Borneo. All 35 crew were rescued.

=== 30 September ===
List of shipwrecks: 30 September 1937
Ship	State	Description
Soløy	Norway	The cargo ship ran aground on Thormanby Island, British Columbia, Canada. She was refloated on 8 October.
Taylor	United Kingdom	The coaster capsized and sank in the North Sea off Buchan Ness, Aberdeenshire, Scotland, with the loss of five of her six crew. The survivor was rescued by the trawler Ocean Princess (United Kingdom).

=== Unknown date ===
List of shipwrecks: Unknown September 1937
Ship	State	Description
Chai We	Republic of China Navy	Second Sino-Japanese War: The Chi We-class gunboat (also known as Kien Yu or Chien Yu) was scuttled at Canton, China in September or October.
Chao Ho	Republic of China Navy	Second Sino-Japanese War: The Chao Ho-class light cruiser was disabled at Canton, China by Imperial Japanese Navy warships, then ran aground and sank on 28 September, or sunk at Canton, China by aircraft from Ryūjō and Hōshō (both Imperial Japanese Navy) on 30 September 1937.
Chung Hai	Republic of China Navy	Second Sino-Japanese War: The Chung Yun-class gunboat was sunk by Japanese aircraft at Canton, China.
Chung Yun	Republic of China Navy	Second Sino-Japanese War: The Chung Yun-class gunboat was scuttled at Canton, China.
Fu Yu	Republic of China Navy	Second Sino-Japanese War: The Fu Yu-class gunboat was sunk at Canton, China by aircraft from Ryūjō and Hōshō (both Imperial Japanese Navy) late in September.
Wu Feng	Republic of China Navy	Second Sino-Japanese War: The Wu Feng-class gunboat was scuttled in the Yangtze at Kiangyin, China, as a blockship on 11 August 1937, or sunk at Canton, China by aircraft from Ryūjō and Hōshō (both Imperial Japanese Navy) on 29 September 1937.

== October ==
=== 1 October ===
List of shipwrecks: 1 October 1937
Ship	State	Description
Briseis	France	The 2,964 GRT cargo ship on a passage from Oran to Rouen with a cargo of wine, struck a rock and sank in Perelle Bay, off Vazon, Guernsey, Channel Islands. All 28 crew were rescued by local fishing boats.
No. 7 Hu Peng	Republic of China Navy	Second Sino-Japanese War: Japanese aircraft sank the Hu Peng-class torpedo boat in the Yangtze at Zhenjiang. Salvaged and put in Japanese service in 1938.

=== 2 October ===
List of shipwrecks: 2 October 1937
Ship	State	Description
Chu Yu	Republic of China Navy	Second Sino-Japanese War: The Chu Yu-class gunboat was sunk by aircraft from Kaga (Imperial Japanese Navy) on the Yangtze at Jiangyin.

=== 3 October ===
List of shipwrecks: 3 October 1937
Ship	State	Description
Ming Sen	Republic of China Navy	Second Sino-Japanese War: Japanese aircraft sank the gunboat at Hankow, China. The Japanese refloated and repaired her in 1939 and commissioned her into service as the repair ship Hitonose (Imperial Japanese Navy).
Nashaba	United States	The cargo ship ran aground at Saint-Vaast-la-Hougue, Manche, France. She was refloated on 15 October.
No. 10 Hu Chung	Republic of China Navy	Second Sino-Japanese War: Japanese aircraft possibly sank the Hu Peng-class torpedo boat in the Yangtze.

=== 4 October ===
List of shipwrecks: 4 October 1937
Ship	State	Description
Vicente Antonio	Mexico	The coastal passenger ship foundered in the Gulf of Mexico with the loss of 22 of the 30 people on board.

=== 5 October ===
List of shipwrecks: 5 October 1937
Ship	State	Description
Hertha	Denmark	The auxiliary three-masted schooner ran aground at Eyrarbakki, Iceland and was wrecked.

=== 7 October ===
List of shipwrecks: 7 October 1937
Ship	State	Description
Hai Chow	Republic of China Navy	Second Sino-Japanese War: The Hai Chow-class gunboat was sunk by aircraft from Hōshō and Ryūjō (both Imperial Japanese Navy) on the Yangtze at Canton, China.

=== 8 October ===
List of shipwrecks: 8 October 1937
Ship	State	Description
No. 8 Hu Ngo	Republic of China Navy	Second Sino-Japanese War: Japanese aircraft sank the Hu Peng-class torpedo boat (a.k.a. Hu Oah) in the Yangtze at Zhenjiang. Salvaged and put in Japanese service in 1938.

=== 9 October ===
List of shipwrecks: 9 October 1937
Ship	State	Description
Penshurst	United Kingdom	The cargo ship collided with Drott (Norway) in the Ghent–Terneuzen Canal, Belgium and sank. She was refloated on 27 October.

=== 10 October ===
List of shipwrecks: 10 October 1937
Ship	State	Description
Kiku Maru	Japan	The 3,096 GRT cargo ship ran aground at Noshappu Point, Hokkaido and was wrecked.
Cabo Santo Tomé	Spanish Navy	Spanish Civil War: The 12,589 GRT blockade runner on a passage from Odessa to Cartagena was shelled and damaged in the Mediterranean Sea 45 nautical miles (83 km; 52 mi) off the coast of Algeria by Canavas del Castillo and Eduardo Dato (both Spanish Navy) with one crew member killed and seven wounded. She was beached and scuttled near El Kala. Survivors were rescued by local fishing vessels.

=== 12 October ===
List of shipwrecks: 12 October 1937
Ship	State	Description
Rex	United States	Leaking and experiencing engine trouble during a voyage from the Aquay River (now the Akwe River) to Yakutat, Territory of Alaska, with a cargo of about 12 tons of salted salmon, the 37-net register ton wooden vessel was wrecked without loss of life on the south-central coast of Alaska six nautical miles (11 km; 6.9 mi) southwest of Ocean Cape (59°32′30″N 139°51′30″W) during a gale. A small gasoline-powered motorboat rescued her two-man crew.

=== 13 October ===
List of shipwrecks: 13 October 1937
Ship	State	Description
Pagao	Italy	The tanker suffered an explosion and fire at Naples, Campania; she was beached.
Therese Moller	United Kingdom	The cargo ship was driven ashore north of Alexandrovsk-Sakhalinsky, Soviet Union (51°17′N 142°09′E) in a typhoon.

=== 14 October ===
List of shipwrecks: 14 October 1937
Ship	State	Description
T.F.C.	United Kingdom	The Thames barge was in collision with Smolni (Soviet Union) in the River Thames and sank.
Vizma	Latvia	The cargo ship collided with Georges Leverdier (France) in the River Seine and was beached.

=== 15 October ===
List of shipwrecks: 15 October 1937
Ship	State	Description
Aylsham	United Kingdom	The cargo ship was driven ashore north of Alexandrovsk-Sakhalinsky, Soviet Union (51°21′N 142°08′E). She was refloated on 19 October.
Oak Villa	United Kingdom	The 222 GRT coaster on a passage from Port Rivals to Liverpool with a cargo of tarmacadam got stranded in Caernarvon Bay. Later refloated but declared total construction loss.
Rosa-Fred	Sweden	The cargo ship ran aground at Strömsund, Jämtland County and was wrecked.

=== 16 October ===
List of shipwrecks: 16 October 1937
Ship	State	Description
Marie Joseph	Haiti	The sailing vessel foundered off Petit-Goâve.
Vickers Vimy	United Kingdom	The schooner ran aground at Greenspond, Newfoundland and was a total loss.

=== 17 October ===
List of shipwrecks: 17 October 1937
Ship	State	Description
Copsewood	United Kingdom	The cargo ship collided with Asturias (Norway) in the River Thames at Gravesend, Kent and was beached. She was later refloated.

=== 19 October ===
List of shipwrecks: 19 October 1937
Ship	State	Description
Reina	Panama	Spanish Civil War: The 1,436 GRT cargo ship was bombed and sunk at Gijón, Asturias by the Nationalist aircraft while unloading contraband military supplies she brought from Gdynia, three days before the city was captured. She was refloated, repaired and put in service again in 1938 as Castillo Olmedo.

=== 20 October ===
List of shipwrecks: 20 October 1937
Ship	State	Description
Argo	United States	The tank barge, carrying 200,000 gallons (4,762 barrels) of crude oil and benzol, sank in a storm in Lake Erie.
C-6	Spanish Navy	Spanish Civil War: The C-class submarine was scuttled off Gijón, Spain. Refloated in November 1947 but sank again.
Dairiguerrme	France	The 1,731 GRT cargo ship on a passage from Nantes to Cardiff with a cargo of iron ore, ran aground at Guilvinec, Finistère and was a total loss.

=== 21 October ===
List of shipwrecks: 21 October 1937
Ship	State	Description
Ciscar	Spanish Navy	Spanish Civil War: The Churruca-class destroyer was sunk by Nationalist aircraft at Gijón. Raised in March, 1938, repaired and put in Nationalist service.

=== 22 October ===
List of shipwrecks: 22 October 1937
Ship	State	Description
Ordu	Turkey	The 1,518 GRT cargo ship on a passage from Zonguldak to İzmir with a cargo of coal, collided with Hamidiye (Turkish Navy) at Beşiktaş and sank with the loss of two crew members.

=== 23 October ===
List of shipwrecks: 23 October 1937
Ship	State	Description
Clan Mackenzie	United Kingdom	The 6,554 GRT cargo ship on a voyage from Liverpool to East London with general cargo, collided with Manchester Regiment (United Kingdom) off Liverpool, Lancashire and sank. Clan Mackenzie was refloated on 18 November badly damaged, and subsequently broken up.
Manchester Regiment	United Kingdom	The cargo ship collided with Clan Mackenzie (United Kingdom) off Liverpool, Lancashire was beached, patched and refloated but was abandoned by her crew and foundered off Hoylake.

=== 24 October ===
List of shipwrecks: 24 October 1937
Ship	State	Description
Aarsten	Norway	The cargo ship was wrecked in the North Sea (53°20′N 2°50′E). The entire crew were rescued by the fishing vessel Eveline (Netherlands).
Axel	Sweden	The cargo ship caught fire in the North Sea (53°30′N 4°50′E) and abandoned. Eleven crew were rescued by Felix Heumann (Germany). Axel was towed into Emden by two tugs.
Haida	United Kingdom	The cargo ship departed from Seattle, Washington, United States on a voyage to Hong Kong. No further trace. A lifebelt from the vessel was discovered in January 1938 on Vancouver Island, Canada.
Oued Mellah	France	Spanish Civil War: The 2,413 GRT cargo ship on a voyage from Casablanca to Port Vendres with a cargo of grain, was bombed and sunk off the Balearic Islands, Spain. All 34 crew survived, 22 of them were rescued by Milan (Marine Nationale).

=== 25 October ===
List of shipwrecks: 25 October 1937
Ship	State	Description
Kaitangata	United Kingdom	The 1,983 GRT coastal tanker on a passage from Hong Kong to Haiphong with a cargo gasoline, exploded, caught fire and sank in the South China Sea 150 nautical miles (280 km) south of Hong Kong. She sank with the loss of nineteen of her 48 crew.
Ying Swei	Republic of China Navy	Second Sino-Japanese War: The disarmed Ying Swei-class light cruiser was sunk by aircraft from Kaga (Imperial Japanese Navy) on the Yangtze at Chiangyin, China.

=== 26 October ===
List of shipwrecks: 26 October 1937
Ship	State	Description
Alfa	Italy	The auxiliary sailing vessel struck a rock and sank off Kakava, Cephalonia, Greece.

=== 27 October ===
List of shipwrecks: 27 October 1937
Ship	State	Description
Blairesk	United Kingdom	The cargo ship ran aground west of Dalhousie, New Brunswick, Canada. She was refloated on 2 November.

=== 29 October ===
List of shipwrecks: 29 October 1937
Ship	State	Description
Aakre	Norway	The cargo ship ran aground on Whitehead Island, Maine, United States. She was refloated on 10 November.

=== 30 October ===
List of shipwrecks: 30 October 1937
Ship	State	Description
Calgadoc	United Kingdom	The 2,201 GRT cargo ship departed from Sydney, Nova Scotia Canada for Wabana, Newfoundland with a cargo of coal. No further trace.
Jean Weems	United Kingdom	Spanish Civil War: The 2,455 GRT cargo ship on a passage from Marseille to Barcelona with general cargo, was bombed and sunk off Cap de Sant Sebastià, Catalonia.
Kathiawar	United Kingdom	The 4,150 GRT cargo liner on a voyage from Calcutta to South Africa with general cargo, was wrecked on the Goa Island Reef, Mozambique.

=== 31 October ===
List of shipwrecks: 31 October 1937
Ship	State	Description
Jean Pierre	France	The schooner caught fire and sank off Saint-Nazaire, Loire-Inférieure.

=== Unknown date ===
List of shipwrecks: Unknown October 1937
Ship	State	Description
Chai We	Republic of China Navy	Second Sino-Japanese War: The Chi We-class gunboat (also known as Kien Yu or Chien Yu) was scuttled at Canton, China in September or October.
Fu An	Republic of China Navy	Second Sino-Japanese War: The training ship, a former transport, was scuttled at Canton, China as a blockship in early October.

== November ==
=== 4 November ===
List of shipwrecks: 4 November 1937
Ship	State	Description
Elling	Norway	The cargo ship ran aground at Bergen, Norway. She was refloated but then beached.
Imatra	Finland	The cargo ship ran aground on Åland and was severely damaged.

=== 5 November ===
List of shipwrecks: 5 November 1937
Ship	State	Description
Briarthorn	United Kingdom	The coaster ran aground at Newport, County Mayo, Ireland. She was refloated on 16 November.
Nossa Senhora d'Agonia	Portugal	The three-masted schooner struck a breakwater at Porto. She was holed and beached.

=== 7 November ===
List of shipwrecks: 7 November 1937
Ship	State	Description
Towneley	United Kingdom	The cargo ship collided with Karnak (Germany) in the Scheldt and was beached.

=== 8 November ===
List of shipwrecks: 8 November 1937
Ship	State	Description
English Trader	United Kingdom	The cargo ship ran aground 15 nautical miles (28 km) north north east of Cabo San Antonio, Cuba.

=== 9 November ===
List of shipwrecks: 9 November 1937
Ship	State	Description
Victoria	Germany	The coaster collided with Stavangeren (Norway) in the Rijn near Hook of Holland, Netherlands. She was beached at Hook of Holland; later refloated, towed to Maassluis, South Holland and beached there.

=== 10 November ===
List of shipwrecks: 10 November 1937
Ship	State	Description
Hibernia	United Kingdom	The Thames barge sprang a leak in the North Sea off Cromer, Norfolk. All three crew were rescued by Cromer lifeboat H F Bailey ( Royal National Lifeboat Institution). Hibernia came ashore at East Runton, Norfolk and was wrecked.

=== 11 November ===
List of shipwrecks: 11 November 1937
Ship	State	Description
Kenilworth	United Kingdom	The cargo ship was driven ashore at Calabanga, Camarines Sur, Philippines in a typhoon.

=== 12 November ===
List of shipwrecks: 12 November 1937
Ship	State	Description
Pylades	United Kingdom	The coaster foundered in the English Channel off Fécamp, Seine-Inférieure, France. All crew were rescued by the trawler Duquesnes (France).

=== 13 November ===
List of shipwrecks: 13 November 1937
Ship	State	Description
Tzenny Chandris	Greece	The 5,815 GRT cargo ship on a voyage from Morehead City to Rotterdam with a cargo of scrap iron, foundered in the Atlantic Ocean east of Cape Hatteras, North Carolina, United States with the loss of eight of her 29 crew. Survivors were rescued by Swiftsure (United States) and USCGC Mendota.
Penton	United Kingdom	The cargo ship came ashore at Kettleness Point, Yorkshire after her tow parted in a gale.
Shi 181	Republic of China Navy	Second Sino-Japanese War: The Shi 34-class motor torpedo boat was lost on this date.

=== 14 November ===
List of shipwrecks: 14 November 1937
Ship	State	Description
Ino	United Kingdom	The cargo ship foundered in the North Sea off the Wandelaer Lightship (Belgium).

=== 17 November ===
List of shipwrecks: 17 November 1937
Ship	State	Description
Beal	United Kingdom	The coaster collided with Authority (United Kingdom) in the River Tyne and was beached at Jenningtree Point. She was refloated later that day.
Lord Roseberry	United Kingdom	The Thames barge sank at Great Yarmouth, Norfolk.
Yeguchi Maru No.2	Japan	The cargo ship was last reported on this date. She was on a voyage from Tientsin to Dairen, China.

=== 18 November ===
List of shipwrecks: 18 November 1937
Ship	State	Description
Boccaccio	Italy	The 3,027 GRT cargo ship on a voyage from Antwerp to Genoa with general cargo, sank in the Bay of Biscay 29 nautical miles (54 km) off Brest, France (48°12′N 5°15′W) following an onboard explosion and fire with the loss of one crew member. All 31 survivors were rescued by Tajandoen (Netherlands). The explosion was caused by a bomb placed by anti-fascist Wollweber League saboteurs while the ship was in port.

=== 19 November ===
List of shipwrecks: 19 November 1937
Ship	State	Description
Evdoxia	Greece	The 1,518 GRT cargo ship on a passage from Akçay to Tonnay-Charente with a cargo of zinc ore, foundered in the Aegean Sea off Cythera. All crew were rescued by Petrakis Nomicos (Greece).
Outeniqua	United Kingdom	The coaster ran aground at Humewood, South Africa. She was refloated on 23 November.

=== 20 November ===
List of shipwrecks: 20 November 1937
Ship	State	Description
"Jay"	United Kingdom	The 117-foot (36 m) trawler sank at the quay at Pointlaw, Aberdeen, Scotland. Raised 28 November, repaired and returned to service.

=== 21 November ===
List of shipwrecks: 21 November 1937
Ship	State	Description
Martha	Estonia	The four-masted schooner sprang a leak off Ystad, Skåne County, Sweden and was beached. She was refloated on 26 November.

=== 22 November ===
List of shipwrecks: 22 November 1937
Ship	State	Description
Rudmore	United Kingdom	The cargo ship collided with Betancuria (Norway) in the River Thames and was beached at North Woolwich, London. She was refloated the next day.

=== 23 November ===
List of shipwrecks: 23 November 1937
Ship	State	Description
Nollington Court	United Kingdom	The 6,097 GRT cargo ship on a voyage from Vancouver to Garston with a cargo of grain and lumber, struck a submerged object off the Turks Islands and was severely damaged. She attempted to reach Tortuga but broke in two and sank. The crew of 35 were rescued by Chagres and Killerig (both United Kingdom).

=== 24 November ===
List of shipwrecks: 24 November 1937
Ship	State	Description
Birka	Germany	The passenger ship ran aground off the Swedish coast and was severely damaged. She was refloated the next day and taken in to Stockholm for repairs.

=== 25 November ===
List of shipwrecks: 25 November 1937
Ship	State	Description
Daian Maru	Japan	The 1,249 GRT cargo ship on a passage from Itozaki to Keelung with a cargo of gasoline in cases, suffered an explosion, caught fire and sank in the Pacific Ocean off Liu Kiu.
Manju Maru	Japan	The 5,863 GRT cargo ship on a voyage from Yokohama to Busreh with general cargo, ran aground off the Muletive Lighthouse, Ceylon. She caught fire on 6 June 1938, but was refloated on 18 August 1938.
Rudolf	Norway	The coaster collided with Godvang (Norway) in the Kiel Canal, Germany, and was beached in a severely damaged state. She was refloated on 29 November.
Tavris	Greece	The cargo ship departed Dedeagatch for Patras. No further trace.

=== 26 November ===
List of shipwrecks: 26 November 1937
Ship	State	Description
Delet	Finland	The passenger ship ran aground on Åland. All passengers and crew were rescued.
Lloyd George	United Kingdom	The cargo ship collided with Fancy (United Kingdom) in the North Sea off Fraserburgh, Aberdeenshire and sank.

=== 27 November ===
List of shipwrecks: 27 November 1937
Ship	State	Description
Caroline	United States	After her gasoline engine broke down, the 8-gross register ton motor vessel drifted ashore at Point Arden (58°09′30″N 134°10′30″W) in Southeast Alaska and broke in two after being pounded by the surf, becoming a total loss. Her crew of four reached shore safely and was rescued on 1 December by the Alaska Game Commission patrol boat Seal (United States).

=== 28 November ===
List of shipwrecks: 28 November 1937
Ship	State	Description
Cauto	United States	The 3,571 GRT cargo ship on a voyage from Tampico to New York with general cargo, ran aground at Puerto México, Mexico and was abandoned by her crew. She was declared a total loss on 9 December.

=== 29 November ===
List of shipwrecks: 29 November 1937
Ship	State	Description
Clan Morrison	United Kingdom	The cargo ship ran aground at Madras, India. She was refloated on 10 December.

=== 30 November ===
List of shipwrecks: 30 November 1937
Ship	State	Description
Brisbane	France	The cargo ship ran aground at Dohan Aslan, Turkey. She was refloated on 8 December.
Geraldton	United Kingdom	The auxiliary schooner struck a submerged object and sank 5 nautical miles (9.3 km) west south west of Cape Baskervill, Western Australia. All crew were rescued.

== December ==
=== 2 December ===
List of shipwrecks: 2 December 1937
Ship	State	Description
Alice	Belgium	The cargo ship ran aground off Southampton, Hampshire, United Kingdom. She was later refloated and scrapped.
Roger-Robert	France	The schooner suffered an onboard explosion and sank 2 nautical miles (3.7 km) off Roscoff, Finistère. All crew were rescued.

=== 3 December ===
List of shipwrecks: 3 December 1937
Ship	State	Description
Meta	Germany	The schooner collided with Ārija (Latvia) at Kiel, Germany, and was beached.

=== 7 December ===
List of shipwrecks: 7 December 1937
Ship	State	Description
Manissa	Germany	The cargo ship came ashore at Adalia, Turkey. She was declared a total loss on 18 December.
Quarrington Court	United Kingdom	The 6,900 GRT cargo ship on a voyage from Calcutta to Baltimore with a cargo of ore, sprang a leak in the Gulf of Suez off Shadwan, Egypt. She was taken in tow by President Doumer (France). She sank the next day 79 nautical miles (146 km) south of the island. All crew were rescued by Capitano A. Cecchi (Italy) and Grangepark (United Kingdom).

=== 10 December ===
List of shipwrecks: 10 December 1937
Ship	State	Description
Aldabi	Netherlands	The cargo ship ran aground at Cape Santa Marta, Brazil. She broke in three and was declared a total loss on 28 December.
Kruckau	Germany	The cargo ship collided with Rinda (Norway) at Brunshausen and was beached. She was later refloated and towed to Hamburg, Germany.

=== 11 December ===
List of shipwrecks: 11 December 1937
Ship	State	Description
Annagher	United Kingdom	The 586 GRT coaster on a passage from Belfast to Llanelly with a cargo of scrap iron, foundered in the Irish Sea off Ballycopeland Point, Groomsport, County Down with the loss of nine of her ten crew.
Gothic	United Kingdom	The 160 GRT coaster on a passage from Dover to Newhaven with a cargo of coal, foundered in the English Channel of Dover, Kent with the loss of two of her four crew. Survivors were rescued by American Banker (United States).
President Hoover	United States	The 21,936 GRT ocean liner on a voyage from San Francisco to Manila, ran aground on Kasho-to, an island east of Formosa. All 503 passengers and 330 crew were safely brought ashore, and President McKinley and President Pierce (both United States) evacuated them from Kasho-to Manila. Hoover broke her back on 18 December and was declared a total loss.

=== 12 December ===
List of shipwrecks: 12 December 1937
Ship	State	Description
Clam	United States	The motor vessel was destroyed by an explosion and fire at the mouth of Very Inlet (54°58′45″N 130°55′30″W) in Southeast Alaska. The only person aboard survived.
Maurita	United Kingdom	The coaster developed defects in her steering gear whilst in the Irish Sea off Hoylake, Lancashire. All five crew were rescued by the Blackpool Lifeboat. The ship later drifted ashore at Fleetwood, Lancashire. She was refloated the next day.
Mei An	United States	Second Sino-Japanese War, USS Panay incident: The Standard Oil tanker was bombed and sunk in the Yangtze River 26 nautical miles (48 km; 30 mi) upstream of Nanking near Hanshan Island. by Imperial Japanese Navy Yokosuka B4Y aircraft. Her captain and many Chinese civilian passengers were killed.
Mei Hsia	United States	Second Sino-Japanese War, USS Panay incident: The Standard Oil tanker was bombed and sunk in the Yangtze River 26 nmi (48 km; 30 mi) upstream of Nanking near Hanshan Island by Imperial Japanese Navy Yokosuka B4Y aircraft. HMS Bee (Royal Navy) rescued her captain.
Mei Ping	United States	Second Sino-Japanese War, USS Panay incident: The Standard Oil tanker was bombed and sunk in the Yangtze River 26 nmi (48 km; 30 mi) upstream of Nanking near Hanshan Island by Imperial Japanese Navy Yokosuka B4Y aircraft. HMS Bee (Royal Navy) rescued her captain.
USS Panay	United States Navy	USS Panay Second Sino-Japanese War, USS Panay incident: The Panay-class river gunboat was bombed and sunk in the Yangtze River 26 nmi (48 km; 30 mi) upstream of Nanking near Hanshan Island by Imperial Japanese Navy Yokosuka B4Y aircraft. Two sailors and one Italian journalist were killed, and 43 sailors and five civilians wounded, of 59 crew.
Thames Maru	Japan	The cargo ship ran aground on Sakhalin Island, Soviet Union. She was refloated on 20 December.
Tormilind	Estonia	The four-masted schooner capsized and sank at Hanko, Finland with some loss of life. Refloated on 3 May 1938.
Unknown junk	Republic of China	Second Sino-Japanese War: The junk was bombed and sunk in the Yangtze River upstream from Nanking by Imperial Japanese Navy Yokosuka B4Y aircraft.

=== 13 December ===
List of shipwrecks: 13 December 1937
Ship	State	Description
Blue Fox	United States	During a voyage in the Territory of Alaska from Pauloff Harbor on Sanak Island to Sand Point on Popof Island, the 56.47-gross register ton, 60.4-foot (18.4 m) motor vessel went off course in a heavy snowstorm and was stranded on the beach at the southeast point of Beaver Bay (55°28′N 160°50′W) on the south coast of the Alaska Peninsula. With seas breaking over her, she flooded in a few minutes, but her crew of four survived and escaped in a dory. While still aground on 17 December, she was smashed to pieces by the surf during a gale.

=== 15 December ===
List of shipwrecks: 15 December 1937
Ship	State	Description
Child	United Kingdom	The dredger lost her tow in the Atlantic Ocean off Cape Sardao, Portugal and came ashore. She was a total loss.
Edith Newhall	United Kingdom	The auxiliary schooner caught fire in the Atlantic Ocean 5 nautical miles (9.3 km) south west of Catalina, Newfoundland and was abandoned by her crew. They were rescued by Northern Ranger (United Kingdom).
Karpfanger	Germany	The cargo ship ran aground off Söderhamn, Sweden. She was refloated on 7 January 1938.
Mabel G	United Kingdom	The schooner came ashore at Conception Bay, Newfoundland.

=== 16 December ===
List of shipwrecks: 16 December 1937
Ship	State	Description
Dan	Panama	The auxiliary three-masted schooner ran aground at Gisslan, Sweden. She was refloated on 28 December.

=== 17 December ===
List of shipwrecks: 17 December 1937
Ship	State	Description
Stuart Star	United Kingdom	The 11,928 GRT Blue Star cargo liner on a voyage from Clyde to Melbourne via Lourenco Marques with general cargo, ran aground off Hood Point Light, East London, Eastern Cape, South Africa. She was abandoned as a total loss.

=== 23 December ===
List of shipwrecks: 23 December 1937
Ship	State	Description
Sinop	Turkey	The cargo ship struck a sunken wreck at Bender Eregli and was beached.
Tavilzade	Greece	The cargo ship came ashore at Bender Eregli. She was refloated on 10 January.

=== 24 December ===
List of shipwrecks: 24 December 1937
Ship	State	Description
31-B-118	United States	The riverboat was wrecked on a beach on Lincoln Island in Lynn Canal near Shelter island in the Alexander Archipelago in Southeast Alaska. The only person aboard was presumed to have lost his life.
Okeanis	Greece	The cargo ship ran aground off the Crimean coast, Soviet Union (approximately 44°N 33°E). She later broke her back and was abandoned as a total loss.
Otto Wulf 2	Germany	The cargo ship collided with Blyth (United Kingdom) off Brunshausen and was beached.

=== 25 December ===
List of shipwrecks: 25 December 1937
Ship	State	Description
Kiang Li	Republic of China Navy	Second Sino-Japanese War: The Kian Yuan-class gunboat was scuttled at Qingdao, China.

=== 26 December ===
List of shipwrecks: 26 December 1937
Ship	State	Description
Saros	United Kingdom	The remains of the Saros in 2007. The cargo ship ran aground at Cape Everard, Victoria, Australia and was abandoned by her crew.
Zhen Hai	Republic of China Navy	Second Sino-Japanese War: The seaplane tender was scuttled at Qingdao.

=== 28 December ===
List of shipwrecks: 28 December 1937
Ship	State	Description
Beulah	Panama	The cargo ship sank at Ogden Point, Victoria, British Columbia, Canada.
Durraween	United Kingdom	The trawler collided with Wanganella (Australia) of Montague Island, New South Wales, Australia.
Inna	Norway	The 489 GRT coaster exploded at Poole while unloading her cargo of fertilizer. She was refloated on 24 January 1938, and towed to Southampton where she was broken up in March 1938.
Vagabond	United States	The motor vessel was blown adrift from the Lundy fox farm on Sullivan Island, Territory of Alaska, and disappeared with the loss of the one person on board.

=== 29 December ===
List of shipwrecks: 29 December 1937
Ship	State	Description
Srdj	Yugoslavia	The 3,644 GRT cargo ship on a passage from Morphou Bay to Antwerp with a cargo of pyrites, collided with Haga (Sweden) in the Scheldt, at Walsoorden, Zeeland, Netherlands and sank with the loss of three crew. Survivors were rescued by Thames (Netherlands). She broke in two on 31 December.

=== 31 December ===
List of shipwrecks: 31 December 1937
Ship	State	Description
Jonita	Estonia	The 422 GRT coaster on a passage from Copenhagen to Gdynia with a cargo of scrap iron, sprang a leak and foundered in the Baltic Sea 7 miles east of Bornholm, Denmark.
La Bougeotte	France	The schooner was abandoned in the Mediterranean Sea (42°15′N 3°41′E). The crew were rescued by Noemijulia (United Kingdom).

== Unknown date ==
List of shipwrecks: Unknown date 1937
Ship	State	Description
Ashland	United States	Abandoned on the beach at Ashland, Wisconsin, in the early 1930s because of financial problems during the Great Depression, the 96.4-foot (29.4 m) 176.63-gross register ton steam tug was salvaged and towed to Red Cliff Bay on the coast of Wisconsin, where she sank in 1937 in the vicinity of (46°52.993′N 090°46.190′W).
City of Taunton	United States	The 292-foot (89 m) cargo ship, a sidewheel paddle steamer, was beached and abandoned at Somerset, Massachusetts, on the west bank of the Taunton River at (41°42′39″N 071°10′33″W), just south of the future site of the Charles M. Braga Jr. Memorial Bridge, sometime during the 1930s. The wreck settled on the river bottom in very shallow water.
Creteboom	Ireland	The 125-foot (38 m), concrete-hulled hulk, an engineless former tugboat, sank in the River Moy, County Mayo, sometime in 1937. Refloated in 1974 and resunk.
F. C. Pendleton	United States	The 145-foot (44 m), 408-gross register ton three-masted schooner burned and sank without loss of life in up to 45 feet (14 m) of water at (44°19′38″N 068°54′27″W) while at anchor in Seal Harbor at Islesboro, Maine, sometime during the 1930s.
Gale	United States	The 139.4-foot (42.5 m), 392-ton steam trawler, out of service, was stripped and disposed of by scuttling off Massachusetts Bay sometime in 1937.
Gardner G. Deering	United States	The 251-foot (77 m), 1,982-gross register ton five-masted schooner was abandoned and later burned in Smith Cove off West Brooksville, Maine, sometime during the 1930s. Her wreck settled in 10 to 30 feet (3.0 to 9.1 m) of water approximately 500 feet (150 m) off the north shore of the cove at (44°22′55″N 068°46′30″W).
Hai Ning	Republic of China Navy	Second Sino-Japanese War: The gunboat was scuttled in 1937 or 1938.
Hornfels	Germany	The 7,400-ton cargo vessel was wrecked sometime in 1937.
Jen Shen	Republic of China Navy	Second Sino-Japanese War: The gunboat was scuttled c. 1937.
Jules Michelet	French Navy	The decommissioned armored cruiser was sunk as a target by the submarine Thetis (French Navy).
Prospector	United States	The 7-gross register ton, 34-foot (10.4 m) motor vessel sank during a gale in Prince William Sound on the south-central coast of the Territory of Alaska. The cutter USCGC Morris ( United States Coast Guard) rescued all six people – five passengers and one crewman – aboard.
Sui Ning	Republic of China Navy	Second Sino-Japanese War: The gunboat was scuttled in 1937 or 1938.
Tai Ning	Republic of China Navy	Second Sino-Japanese War: The gunboat was scuttled in 1937 or 1938.
Yung Shen	Republic of China Navy	Second Sino-Japanese War: The gunboat was scuttled c. 1937.
