= Lincoln Island =

Lincoln Island may refer to:

- Lincoln Island (Alaska), an island in Lynn Canal in Alaska, United States
- Lincoln Island, one of the Paracel Islands in the South China Sea known as Dōng Dǎo in Chinese and Đảo Linh-Côn in Vietnamese
- Lincoln Island, a fictional island in Jules Verne's novel The Mysterious Island
