= Beaver Bay =

Beaver Bay may refer to:

== Places ==
- Beaver Bay, Minnesota, U.S.
- Beaver Bay Township, Lake County, Minnesota, U.S.
- Beaver Bay (Alaska), site of the Blue Fox shipwreck in 1937

== Geology ==
- Beaver Bay Complex, a rock formation in Minnesota, U.S.
- Beaver Bay Group, is a geologic group in Alaska, U.S.

== See also ==
- Beaver, Bay County, Michigan, U.S.
