= Ralston Island =

Island in Alaska, United States

Coordinates: 58°31′47″N 135°02′13″W

Ralston Island is a small island in the Alexander Archipelago, northwest of Lincoln Island and northwest of Juneau, Alaska, United States. It was named in 1868 by Commander R. W. Meade, USN, for W. C. Ralston; the name was published by the U. S. Coast and Geodetic Survey in the 1883 Coast Pilot. The first European to sight the island was Joseph Whidbey, master of HMS Discovery during George Vancouver's 1791–95 expedition, in 1794.
