= SS Woodville =

1892 steamship

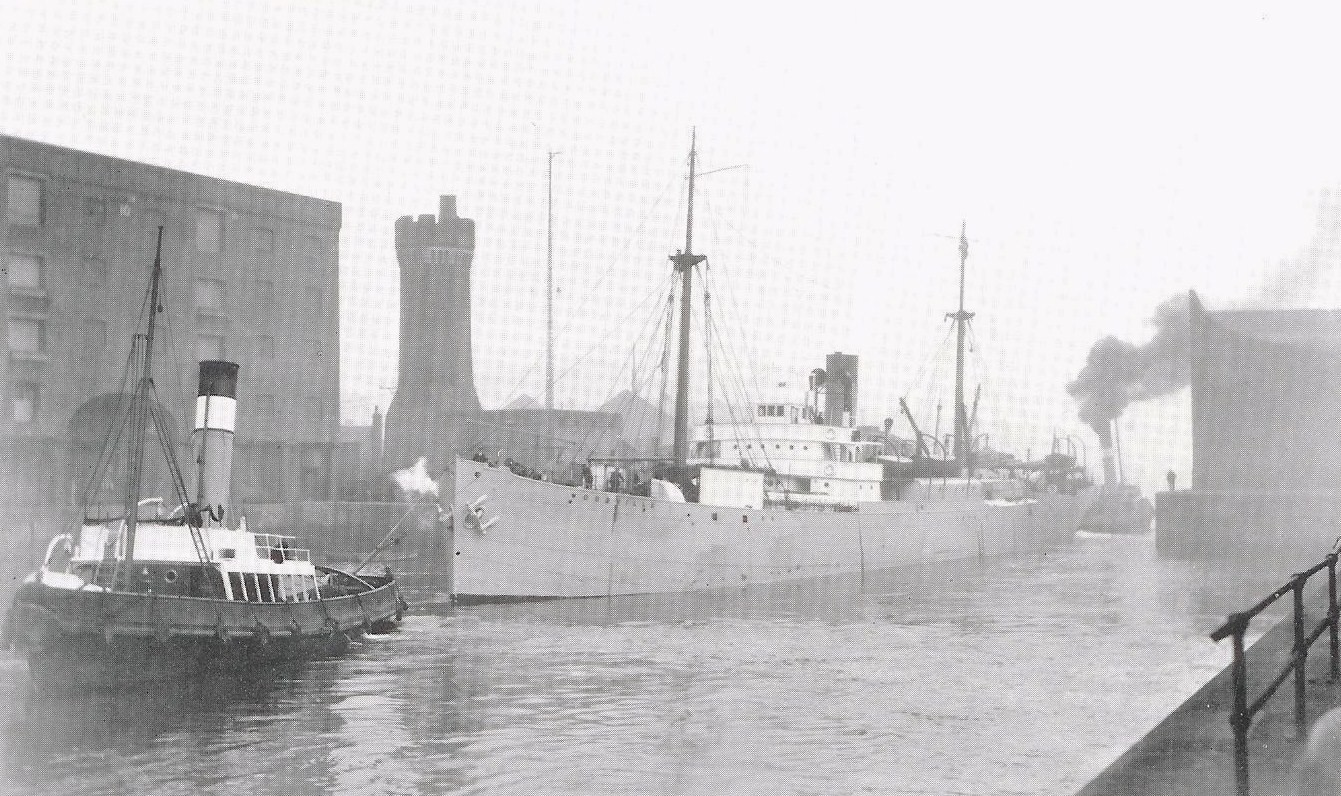
- SS Woodville in Liverpool docks

History
- Name: Woodville (1892–1927); Volgas (1927–1937)
- Owner: Woodville SS Co Ltd (Balls & Stansfield) (1892–1916); Southern Whaling & Sealing Company (1916–1924); African and Eastern Trade Corporation (1924–1927); BJ Andreadakis & A Stavridis (1927–1937)
- Port of registry: United Kingdom (1892–1927); Greece (1927–1937)
- Builder: John Readhead & Sons, South Shields
- Yard number: 285
- Launched: 22 October 1892
- Acquired: November 1892
- Identification: Official number: 102028
- Fate: Wrecked 11 January 1937

General characteristics
- Tonnage: 2,513 GRT, 1,593 NRT
- Length: 91.1 m (299 ft)
- Beam: 12.4 m (41 ft)
- Draught: 5.7 m (19 ft)
- Propulsion: Triple expansion steam engine, single screw, 232 hp (173 kW)

The 2,500-ton steamship Woodville was built in 1892 for Woodville SS Co Ltd (Balls & Stansfield) of North Shields, England. She was then sold during World War I to the Southern Whaling and Sealing Company, Liverpool.

She was one of three ships bought by the African and Eastern Trade Corporation in 1924. She was sold to Greek owners BJ Andreadakis & A Stavridis, (Piraeus) in 1927, shortly before African and Eastern merged with the Royal Niger Company to form United Africa Company (UAC).

In March 1922, Leonard Hussey accompanied the body of Ernest Shackleton from Montevideo, Uruguay, to South Georgia for burial at Grytviken, aboard Woodville.

Whilst under her latest name of SS Volgas and with a Greek flag, she ran aground on the small Greek island of Milos in the Aegean Sea on 11 January 1937. She came ashore near the lighthouse on Paximadia, southwest of Milos, during a voyage from Mersin, Turkey, to Hamburg, Germany, with a cargo of grain. Salvage was abandoned on 16 January and she was declared a total loss.
