= Eagle River (Bradfield Canal) =

- Location of the mouth of the Eagle River in Alaska

Location
- Country: United States
- State: Alaska
- Borough: City and Borough of Wrangell

Physical characteristics
- Source: Eagle Lake
  - location: Coast Mountains, Tongass National Forest
  - coordinates: 56°04′19″N 131°29′02″W
  - elevation: 376 ft (115 m)
- Mouth: Eagle Bay
  - location: 5 miles (8 km) southwest of the head of Bradfield Canal
  - coordinates: 56°09′49″N 131°35′51″W
  - elevation: 0 ft (0 m)
- Length: 8 mi (13 km)

The Eagle River is a stream, 8 miles (13 km) long, in the borough of Wrangell in the U.S. state of Alaska. Heading at Eagle Lake in the Coast Mountains, it flows northwest through part of the Tongass National Forest into Eagle Bay on the Bradfield Canal. Near the midpoint of its course, the river passes through Little Eagle Lake. On the shore opposite Eagle Bay and the Eagle River mouth, the Harding River enters Bradfield Canal.

== Recreation ==
The United States Forest Service manages a public-use cabin, accessible only by floatplane, at Eagle Lake. Eagle Lake Cabin, about 1 mile (2 km) from the Eagle River outlet, comes with a 14-foot (4.3 m) oared skiff for fishing. Eagle Lake supports a population of "trophy" coastal cutthroat trout.

Although the cabin is open year-round, lake ice may prevent floatplanes from landing. Amenities are minimal and do not include electricity or drinking water. Hunters as well as fishers sometimes rent the cabin.

Major game fish in the Eagle River itself include pink and chum salmon, and Dolly Varden char, as well as coastal cutthroat trout. These fish are accessible by boat traveling upriver from the mouth.

The Forest Service manages a public-use cabin, the Harding River Cabin, about 2 miles (3 km) across Bradfield Canal from the Eagle River mouth. Renters of this cabin sometimes fish along the Eagle River or hunt for waterfowl on its tidal flats.

== See also ==
- List of rivers of Alaska
