= Favorite Channel =

Coordinates: 58°29′22″N 134°52′58″W

Favorite Channel is a channel in Southeast Alaska, northwest of Juneau, Alaska, United States. It is 25 kilometres (16 mi) long, extending northwest from Stephens Passage to Lynn Canal, separating Lincoln and Shelter islands from the mainland to the east. It was named in 1880 by U.S. Navy officers after the 80-foot (24 m) steamboat Favorite (built in 1874), which was chartered by the Navy for surveying work in Alaska, later being used to carry out trading and fishing for the herring plant at Killisnoo. The first European to traverse and chart the channel was Joseph Whidbey, master of HMS Discovery during George Vancouver's 1791–95 expedition, in 1794.
