= SS Umtali =

Three steamships of Bullard, King & Co Ltd. were named Umtali:

- SS Umtali (1896), in service until 1925
- SS Umtali (1936), in service until 1957
- SS Umtali (1942), in service 1951–52
