= Shelter Island (Alaska) =

Island in the United States of America

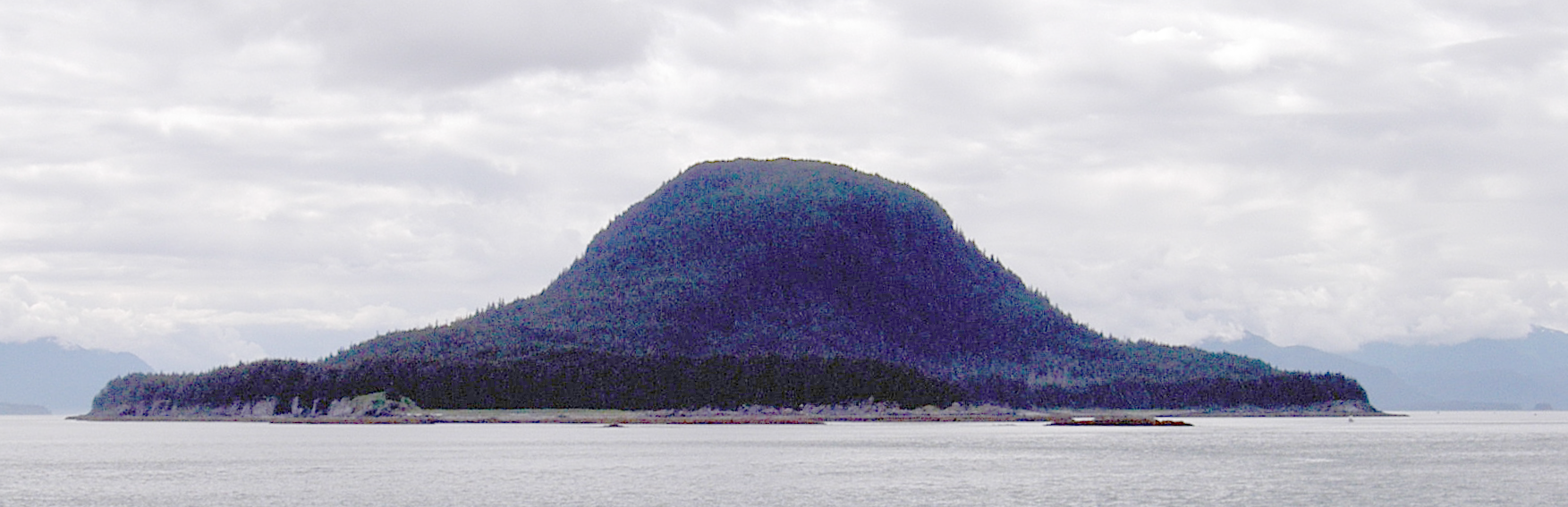
- North end of Shelter Island (2011)

- Location within Alaska Location within North America

Geography
- Coordinates: 58°25′00″N 134°51′15″W
- Archipelago: Alexander Archipelago

Administration
- United States
- State: Alaska

Shelter Island is an island in the Alexander Archipelago, southeast of Lincoln Island and northwest of Juneau, Alaska, U.S. It trends northwest between Favorite and Saginaw channels. It was named in 1869 by Commander R. W. Meade of the United States Navy. The first European to sight the island was Joseph Whidbey, master of HMS Discovery during George Vancouver's 1791–95 expedition, in 1794.

== Gallery ==
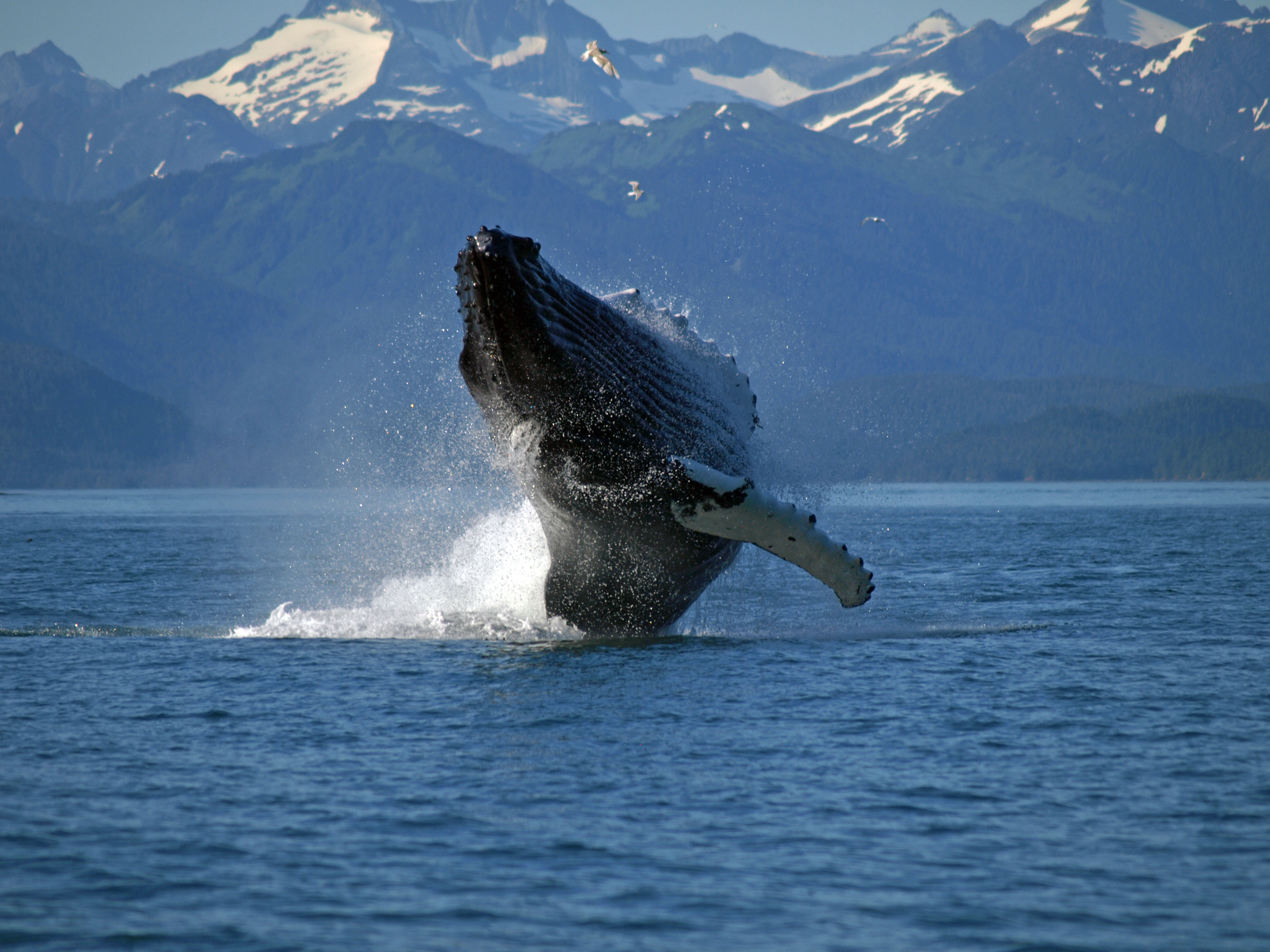
Humpback whale breaching just off South Shelter Island
