= Bradfield Canal =

Inlet in Alaska, United States

Coordinates: 56°12′27″N 131°43′45″W

Bradfield Canal is an inlet in Southeast Alaska, United States. It extends 30 kilometres (19 mi) west from the mouth of the Bradfield River to Ernest Sound at Point Warde. It was first charted in 1793 by James Johnstone, one of George Vancouver's officers during his 1791–95 expedition. Vancouver later named it "Bradfield Channel".
