= Lincoln Island (Alaska) =

Island in Juneau, Alaska, United States

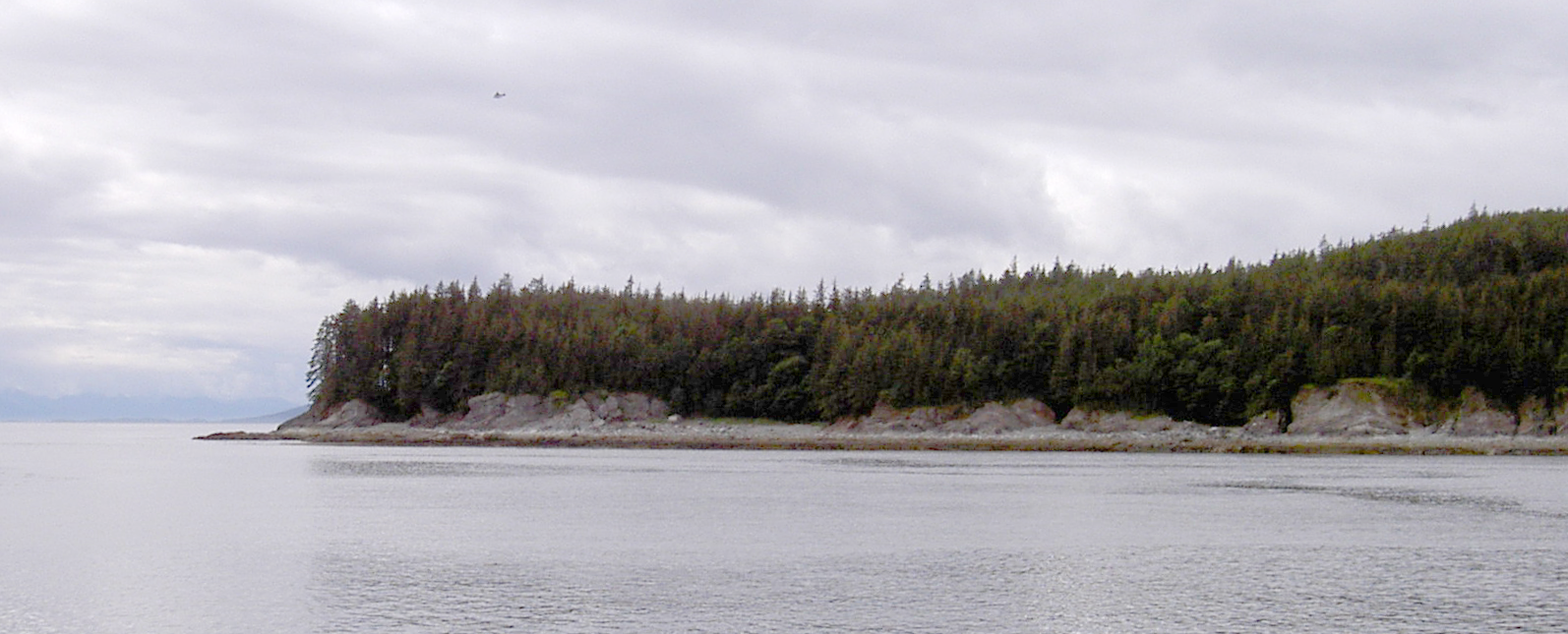
Southern tip of Lincoln Island (2011)

Lincoln Island is a wooded island in Lynn Canal in Alaska, United States. Located at 58°29′41″N 134°59′40″W, the island is one kilometer northwest of larger Shelter Island and some 200 meters southeast of smaller Ralston Island. It is part of the Juneau City and Borough. The first European to sight the island was Joseph Whidbey, master of HMS Discovery during George Vancouver's 1791–1795 expedition, in 1794. It was named in 1868 by Commander R. W. Meade, USN, presumably for Abraham Lincoln.
