= Italian submarine Onice =

Italian submarine

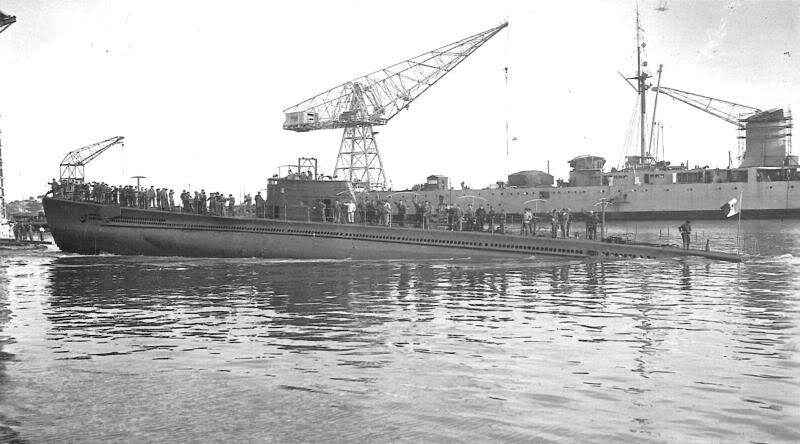
- Onice being launched at Muggiano, 15 June 1936

History

Kingdom of Italy
- Name: Onice
- Namesake: Onyx
- Builder: OTO, Muggiano
- Laid down: 27 August 1935
- Launched: 15 June 1936
- Commissioned: 1 September 1936
- Fate: Struck, 1 February 1948

General characteristics
- Class & type: Perla-class submarine
- Displacement: 696 t (685 long tons) normal (surfaced); 852.5 t (839 long tons) normal (submerged)
- Length: 60.18 m (197 ft 5 in)
- Beam: 6.45 m (21 ft 2 in)
- Draft: 4.7 m (15 ft 5 in)
- Installed power: 1,200 bhp (890 kW) (diesels); 800 hp (600 kW) (electric motors)
- Propulsion: Diesel-electric; 2 × FIAT diesel engines; 2 × CRDA electric engines
- Speed: 14 knots (26 km/h; 16 mph) surfaced; 7.5 knots (13.9 km/h; 8.6 mph) submerged
- Range: 5,200 nmi (9,600 km; 6,000 mi) at 8 knots (15 km/h; 9.2 mph) surfaced; 74 nmi (137 km; 85 mi) at 4 knots (7.4 km/h; 4.6 mph) submerged
- Test depth: 70–80 m (230–260 ft)
- Complement: 44 (4 officers + 40 non-officers and sailors)
- Crew: 45
- Armament: 6 × 533 mm (21 in) torpedo tubes (4 bow, 2 stern); 1 × single 100 mm (4 in) deck gun; 2 × single 13.2 mm (0.52 in) machine guns

Onice was a Perla-class submarine built for the Regia Marina (Royal Italian Navy) during the 1930s. She played a minor role in the Spanish Civil War of 1936–1939 supporting the Spanish Nationalists.

== Design and description ==
The Perla-class submarines were essentially repeats of the preceding Sirena class. The modifications that were made compared to the boats of the previous series were mostly of upgrade nature. Among them were enlargement of the false tower at the top, more modern engines, installation of a radiogoniometer that could be controlled from inside the ship. Improvements and the installation of new air conditioning equipment meant a slight increase in displacement, and increase in the fuel stowage also increased the autonomy of these boats compared to the previous series. Their designed full load displacement was 695 metric tons (684 long tons) surfaced and 855 metric tons (841 long tons) submerged, but varied somewhat depending on the boat and the builder. The submarines were 197 feet 6 inches (60.20 m) long, had a beam of 21 feet (6.4 m) and a draft of 15 feet (4.6 m) to 15 feet 5 inches (4.70 m). They had an operational diving depth of 70–80 meters (230–260 ft). Their crew numbered 45 officers and enlisted men.

For surface running, the boats were powered by two diesel engines, each driving one propeller shaft with overall power of 675–750 hp (503–559 kW). When submerged each propeller was driven by a 400-horsepower (298 kW) electric motor. They could reach 14 knots (26 km/h; 16 mph) on the surface and 7.5 knots (13.9 km/h; 8.6 mph) underwater. On the surface, the Perla class had a range of 5,200 nautical miles (9,600 km; 6,000 mi) at 8 knots (15 km/h; 9.2 mph), submerged, they had a range of 74 nmi (137 km; 85 mi) at 4 knots (7.4 km/h; 4.6 mph).

The boats were armed with six internal 53.3-centimeter (21 in) torpedo tubes, four in the bow and two in the stern. One reload torpedo was carried for each tube, for a total of twelve. They were also armed with one 100-millimeter (3.9 in) deck gun for combat on the surface. The light anti-aircraft armament consisted of one or two pairs of 13.2-millimeter (0.52 in) machine guns.

== Construction and career ==
Onice was built by OTO at their shipyard in Muggiano, laid on 27 August 1935, launched on 15 June 1936 and completed on 1 September 1936.

After delivery, Onice was assigned to the 34th Squadron (III Submarine group) based at Messina. After a brief training, in 1937 she carried out a long endurance cruise in the Dodecanese, Tyrrhenian Sea and Ionian Sea.

On August 12, 1937, she sailed from Naples under command of captain Mario Ricci to carry out a secret mission outside of Tarragona during the Spanish Civil War. The submarine fired two torpedoes at a tanker off Salou on August 17, but missed. On August 27, 1937, she returned to Naples.

In September 1937 the Nyon Conference was called by France and Great Britain to address the "underwater piracy" conducted against merchant traffic in the Mediterranean. On September 14, an agreement was signed establishing British and French patrol zones around Spain (with a total of 60 destroyers and airforce employed) to counteract aggressive behavior by submarines. Italy was not directly accused, but had to comply with the agreement and suspend the underwater operations.

Under pressure from Franco's regime, Italy decided to transfer 4 more submarines (in addition to Archimede and Evangelista Torricelli already being operated by the Falangists) to the Spanish Legion (Legión Española or Tercio de Extranjeros). Onice was one of the four boats chosen for the transfer. On September 17, 1937 Onice left La Maddalena and headed to Soller on Mallorca, and arrived there on September 23, 1937. She was placed under the direct command of Spanish admiral Francisco Moreno, was renamed Aguilar Tablada and assigned pennant number L4. However, Onice retained her commander (captain Mario Ricci), senior officers and Italian crew, but they had to wear Spanish uniforms and insignia.

The other three Italian submarines transferred to Tercio were Iride (Gonzalez Lopez), Galileo Galilei (General Mola II) and Galileo Ferraris (General Sanjurjo II). All four were based at Soller. Onice (Aguilar Tablada) became the first to start operations, serving in "Tercio" for four months, and conducting 3 missions.

During October 8 through 18, 1937 Onice carried out her first mission under the Nationalist flag starting between Benidorm and Alicante (until October 12) and then off Cartagena. There were several occasions to attack, but they all were wasted for various reasons, along with wasted torpedoes which resulted in heavy criticism of Captain Ricci and his apparent lack of expertise.

During November 2 through 11, 1937 Onice carried out her second mission patrolling off Tarragona under a new commander, captain Alfredo Criscuolo. She attacked one steamer, but a failure of the echo sounder and the hydrophones forced Onice to return to Cagliari for repairs.

During January 31 through February 4, 1938 she carried out her third and last mission, under command of captain Manlio Petroni, off Tarragona but without any results. On February 5, 1938, she left Soller and returned to Italy and assumed her old name of Onice ending her "legionary" career.

In 1939 she was based at La Spezia, and later at the Red Sea base of Massawa in Eritrea together with Iride and Berillo. She returned to Italy in 1940 and was based at Messina.

At the time of Italy's entrance into World War II Onice was assigned to the 13th Squadron (I Submarine Group) based at La Spezia together with Gemma and Berillo. Captain Gustavo Lovatelli was her commander and would remain in charge until October 1942. In the early stages of the war, Onice conducted some missions in the Strait of Sicily but she never even sighted an enemy ship.

On September 28, 1940, while maneuvering in the port of Messina Onice collided with Diana and sustained some damage requiring repairs. Once the repairs were finished, she was deployed to Leros.

In November 1940 she patrolled northwest of Alexandria.

During December 21, 1940 through 1 January 1941 Onice conducted a patrol in the Aegean Sea.

On March 7, 1941, Onice under command of captain Gustavo Lovatelli was sent to patrol an area north of Crete, and attack British convoys sailing between Alexandria and Piraeus during British Operation "Lustre" (transfer of 58,000 British soldiers to Greece in anticipation of a German invasion). On the night of March 8, Onice sighted several warships, including a cruiser, moving through the Strait of Kasos. She launched two torpedoes at the cruiser, but missed the target. On March 9, 1941, she returned to the base.

In May 1941 she patrolled south of Strait of Kasos. In the early morning of May 21 Onice receives an order to move to a new patrol area in support of German invasion of Crete (Operation "Merkur"). At 13:15 of May 21 Onice sighted three destroyers eight miles south of the Strait of Kasos and launched three torpedoes against one of them, but the attack is unsuccessful.

On September 25, 1941 Onice, while conducting an anti-submarine patrol off Benghazi along with patrol boats Zuri and Zirona, detected at 00:45 in the position 32°25′N 19°45′E a noise from diesel engines. Thinking she detected a submarine, and it's quite possible it was British submarine Thrasher, that was active in the area, Onice surfaced at 1:50 and warned Zuri and Zirona. All three ships went on a search for an enemy submarine, but they couldn't maintain contact. An incoming convoy to Benghazi consisting of ships Iseo, Capo Faro and torpedo boat Orione arrived at 2:40, and got warned about the enemy submarine presence by Onice. Actually, Thrasher already attacked the convoy earlier, but no ships were hit.

On September 28, 1941 Onice was assigned to Benghazi to conduct daily anti-submarine patrols to protect convoys from and to Libya.

During the night of October 1, Onice was on an anti-submarine patrol in an anticipation of arrival of a German convoy coming from Naples and heading to Benghazi. The convoy consisted of steamers Savona and Castellon, escorted by torpedo boats Calliope and Pegaso and was expected to arrive in the morning of October 2. Patrol boats Zuri and Selve were also on patrol as the Benghazi navy command believed there were British submarines hiding outside Benghazi harbor. Onice left the area shortly after midnight while Zuri and Selve continued their search until the arrival of the convoy. Despite much effort by the Italians, at 10:12 on October 2 British submarine Perseus was able to attack and sink steamer Castellon.

On October 10, 1941, while surfaced she exchanged torpedo attacks and gunfire with a British submarine, but the combat was inconclusive.

On October 14, 1941 Onice was reassigned to Messina. For the rest of the year she was involved in several patrols in the Strait of Sicily with no results.

On January 3, 1942, she was deployed to patrol an area south-southeast of Malta with the task of detecting and attacking any British naval forces that would have tried to intercept a large supply convoy M. 43 to Libya, but she didn't sight any British vessels.

On March 11, 1942, Onice under command of captain Bruno Zelik was sent to patrol in the Eastern Mediterranean, and stayed on patrol until March 27. On March 16, while patrolling off Cape dell'Armi, she was attacked by British submarine P-36 who launched two torpedoes. Onice maneuvered to avoid being hit and counterattacked by also launching torpedoes and opening fire with the deck gun forcing the enemy submarine to dive and retreat.

At 17.45 on March 21, 1942 Onice, while on patrol southwest of Cape Krio, sighted in the position 34°18′N 22°36′E a group of unknown ships moving north-northwest. Due to high wind and rough seas Onice struggled to stay at the periscope depth or even identify the type of sighted vessels. At 17:47 she radioed a discovery message to Supermarina which was received at 20:00.

The ships sighted by Onice were part of the MW10 convoy, traveling from Alexandria to Malta with urgent supplies for the garrison of the island. There were three cargo ships (Clan Campbell, Pampas and Talbot) and four tankers(Cleopatra, Penelope, Dido and Euryalus), accompanied by an escort of an anti-aircraft cruiser and 12 destroyers. An Italian naval force sortied to attack the convoy, but in the subsequent battle (Second Battle of Sirte) it could only damage some ships of the escort without being able to reach the convoy. Axis air force sank one of the merchants (Clan Campbell) the next day and destroyed three more vessels after their arrival in Malta.

At 13:42 on March 23, 1942, Onice detected through hydrophones British Force B that was returning to Alexandria after the battle. She closed in and at 14:15 sighted the ships of Force B (estimated to be composed of 3 or 4 cruisers, plus some destroyers). At 14:33 Onice launched two torpedoes from about 3,000 meters in the position 34°14′N 22°26′E. After 3 minutes two explosions were heard, but in fact no ships were hit, and the British force did not even notice the attack.

At dawn on April 28, 1942, while patrolling east of Cape Bon, Onice sighted what she had thought to be a big submarine and launched two torpedoes but missed. In fact, it appears there were no British submarines present in this area on this date. It is possible that Onice mistook a fishing boat for a submarine, or she tried to attack Corallo which could have possibly been passing through this area.

At 21:15 on May 9, 1942, Onice sighted HMS Welshman disguised as a French destroyer Léopard traveling to Malta with an urgent load of supplies, 100 Rolls-Royce Merlin aircraft engines and some RAF personnel. Onice maneuvered into attack position, but suddenly aborted it due to captain Zelik's perceived threat from British aircraft. However, there were actually no British planes present at this time.

On June 11, 1942 Onice was sent along with four other submarines (Ascianghi, Aradam, Dessiè and Corallo) to patrol the triangle between Malta, Pantelleria and Lampedusa to intercept a British convoy, part of Operation "Harpoon". Onice failed to detect any enemy ships.

Following the Allied invasion of Sicily, Onice was transferred to Taranto.

On September 3, 1943, under the Zeta Plan, ten submarines were deployed in the Ionian Sea and Tyrrhenian Sea to defend the coasts of Calabria and Campania from anticipated Anglo-American landings. Onice was deployed in the western Ionian Sea between the Gulf of Squillace and the Straits of Messina.

On September 8, 1943, at the time of announcement of the Armistice Onice was still in the Ionian Sea. She received orders to proceed to Augusta and surrender to Allies.

On September 16, 1943, she left Augusta at sunset along with five other submarines and headed to Malta where she arrived the next day.

On October 6, 1943, she left Malta together with several other ships and headed to Naples. There she would serve as an electricity generator for the city for several days. She then moved to Augusta and then to Taranto, where she underwent some repair work.

On June 10, 1944, after finishing her repairs, Onice under command of captain Ferdinando Boggetti left Taranto and headed to Gibraltar and from there to Bermuda. On July 16, 1944 Onice arrived in Bermuda where she would serve as a training ship for Allies. Between August 1944 and January 1945 she would participate in more than 50 exercises helping Allied ships to practice their anti-submarine techniques.

On January 20, 1945, Onice left Bermuda for New London, then Portland where she participated in 54 more exercises. On May 13, 1945 Onice was moved to Portsmouth for some repair work. She left Portsmouth on September 20, 1945, for Bermuda and from there she sailed all the way back to Italy, arriving in Taranto on November 3, 1945, finally bringing an end to her war career.

Under the terms of Paris Peace Treaty, Italy was obligated to demolish all of her submarine fleet. On February 1, 1948 Onice was struck and finally demolished in 1949.
