= Greek submarine Matrozos =

At least two ships of the Hellenic Navy have borne the name Matrozos :

- Greek submarine Matrozos (Y-7) a Perla-class submarine captured by the Royal Navy in 1942 and renamed on transfer to Greece in 1943. She was stricken in 1947.
- Greek submarine Matrozos (S-122) a Type 214 submarine commissioned in 2016.
