= Italian submarine Corallo =

Submarine of the Italian Royal Navy

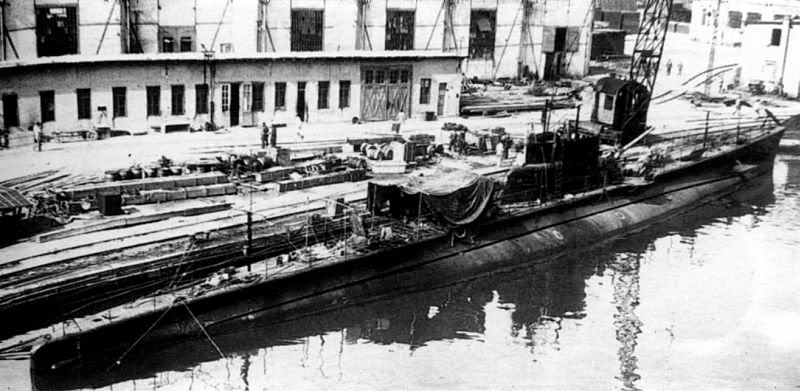
- RIN Corallo

History

Kingdom of Italy
- Name: Corallo
- Namesake: Coral
- Builder: CRDA, Monfalcone
- Laid down: 1 October 1935
- Launched: 2 August 1936
- Commissioned: 26 September 1936
- Fate: Sunk, 13 December 1942

General characteristics
- Class & type: Perla-class submarine
- Displacement: 626.115 tonnes (616 long tons) standard; 700.54 tonnes (689 long tons) normal (surfaced); 859.69 tonnes (846 long tons) normal (submerged)
- Length: 60.18 m (197 ft 5 in)
- Beam: 6.454 m (21 ft 2.1 in)
- Draft: 4.709 m (15 ft 5.4 in)
- Installed power: 1,350 hp (1,010 kW) (diesels); 800 hp (600 kW) (electric motors)
- Propulsion: Diesel-electric; 2 × CRDA diesel engines; 2 × CRDA electric engines
- Speed: 14 knots (26 km/h; 16 mph) surfaced; 7.5 knots (13.9 km/h; 8.6 mph) submerged
- Range: 5,200 nmi (9,600 km; 6,000 mi) at 8 knots (15 km/h; 9.2 mph) surfaced; 74 nmi (137 km; 85 mi) at 4 knots (7.4 km/h; 4.6 mph) submerged
- Test depth: 80 m (260 ft)
- Complement: 44 (4 officers + 40 non-officers and sailors)
- Armament: 6 × 533 mm (21 in) torpedo tubes (4 bow, 2 stern); 1 × 100 mm (4 in) / 47 caliber deck gun; 2 x 1 – 13.2 mm (0.52 in) anti-aircraft guns

Italian submarine Corallo was a Perla-class submarine built for the Royal Italian Navy (Regia Marina) during the 1930s. She was named after a gemstone Coral.

== Design and description ==
The Perla-class submarines were essentially repeats of the preceding Sirena class. The modifications that were made compared to the boats of the previous series were mostly of upgrade nature. Among them were enlargement of the false tower at the top, more modern engines, installation of a radiogoniometer that could be controlled from inside the ship. Improvements and the installation of new air conditioning equipment meant a slight increase in displacement, and increase in the fuel stowage also increased the autonomy of these boats compared to the previous series. Their designed full load displacement was 695 metric tons (684 long tons) surfaced and 855 metric tons (841 long tons) submerged, but varied somewhat depending on the boat and the builder. The submarines were 197 feet 6 inches (60.20 m) long, had a beam of 21 feet (6.4 m) and a draft of 15 feet (4.6 m) to 15 feet 5 inches (4.70 m).

For surface running, the boats were powered by two diesel engines, each driving one propeller shaft with overall power of 675–750 hp (503–559 kW). When submerged each propeller was driven by a 400-horsepower (298 kW) electric motor. They could reach 14 knots (26 km/h; 16 mph) on the surface and 7.5 knots (13.9 km/h; 8.6 mph) underwater. On the surface, the Perla class had a range of 5,200 nautical miles (9,600 km; 6,000 mi) at 8 knots (15 km/h; 9.2 mph), submerged, they had a range of 74 nmi (137 km; 85 mi) at 4 knots (7.4 km/h; 4.6 mph).

The boats were armed with six internal 53.3 cm (21.0 in) torpedo tubes, four in the bow and two in the stern. One reload torpedo was carried for each tube, for a total of twelve. They were also armed with one 100 mm (4 in) deck gun for combat on the surface. The light anti-aircraft armament consisted of one or two pairs of 13.2 mm (0.52 in) machine guns.

== Construction and career ==
Corallo was built by CRDA at their shipyard in Monfalcone, laid on 1 October 1935, launched on 2 August 1936 and completed on 26 September 1936.

After delivery, Corallo was assigned to the 34th Squadron (III Submarine Group) based at Messina. After a brief training, she carried out a long endurance cruise in the Dodecanese and the Adriatic. In 1937 she carried out a training campaign, followed by another one in 1938. On October 15, 1938, she was temporarily assigned to Flotilla Submarine school. In 1939 Corallo returned to active duty, and was assigned to the 72nd Squadron (VII Submarine Group) based at Cagliari where she remained until the end of her career.

Italy's entry into World War II found Corallo at Monfalcone undergoing repairs and maintenance which were finished in late August 1940. On September 3, 1940, Corallo, under command of captain Loris Albanese, was sent to patrol an area 60 miles south of Crete, between Gaudo and Alexandria. At 18:00 on September 17 Corallo sighted in the position 33°34′N 25°34′E a zigzagging British column heading towards Alexandria. The British force was made up of the aircraft carrier HMS Illustrious, battleship HMS Valiant escorted by five destroyers returning to Alexandria after bombarding Derna and Benghazi. At 18:30 Corallo launched two torpedoes from 1,500 meters against HMS Illustrious and immediately dove down to 80 meters. After 75 seconds two loud explosions were heard, but no ship, however, was hit. Corallo was then subjected to depth charge attacks by the destroyers which went on for 3 hours. The submarine suffered some damage which impaired her operational efficiency, and two crew members died in the attack. Since the damage to submarine could not be repaired by means available at sea, Corallo was forced to interrupt her mission and headed to Tobruk which she reached on September 18, 1940.

On November 5, 1940, Corallo and four other submarines (Topazio, Fratelli Bandiera, Pier Capponi and Goffredo Mameli) were deployed about 90 miles south-east of Malta with the task of intercepting a British convoy, part of Operation "Coat". Corallo and other submarines formed a barrier with a 20 to 30 miles spacing between them. Corallo, however, did not detect any enemy vessels.

On January 21, 1941, Corallo and Diaspro patrolled off the northern Tunisian coast. Corallo had to abort her mission almost immediately due to a failure, and the submarine had to return to the base.

In February 1941 she was on patrol north of Cape Bougaroun, but engine problems forced the submarine to return to the base.

In April 1941 she patrolled south of Sardinia, but her mission was cut short again, this time because of the adverse weather conditions.

In May 1941 she patrolled around 50 miles west of the island of La Galite without any sightings.

In July 1941 Corallo was involved in another uneventful patrol southwest of Sardinia.

In October 1941 she was posted off Cap Zebib, but still without success.

On November 3, 1941, Corallo under command of captain Andreani was deployed west of Malta as a protective screen for a large Italian "Beta" convoy travelling to Libya. Her job was to detect and report any British naval movements west of Malta, and attack the sighted ships when possible. On November 9, 1941, the "Beta" convoy was intercepted and destroyed by British Force K in the Battle of the Duisburg Convoy. Force K managed to leave Malta without Corallo being able to detect it since it did not pass through her area of operation, but rather through the one controlled by Luigi Settembrini. At sunset, the submarine left her assigned area and moved to her new area of operations off Algeria and Tunisia.

In January 1942 she patrolled between Malta and Capo Passero.

In March 1942 Corallo again patrolled off Malta.

In April 1942 Coralllo was sent to patrol off Cape Bon. At 4:10 on April 28, 1942, off Bona, Algeria, Corallo stopped Tunisian sailboats Dar es Salaam (138 GRT) and Tunis (41 GRT). The boats carried a Vichy France flag, but didn't have a special permit allowing them to sail. Corallo took their crew on board, thirteen men in total, then sank the sailboats with gunfire in the position 37°01′N 11°09′E.

In May and June 1942 she patrolled east of the island of La Galite. At 2:00 on June 7, 1942, Corallo stopped another Tunisian sailboat Hady M'Hammed (26 GRT). Believing the boat was carrying materials on behalf of the Allies, captain Adreani ordered the crew of the sailboat (6 men) to abandon ship, took them prisoners and then sank the sailboat with gunfire in the position 37°24′N 09°10′E. Corallo then received an order to patrol another area northwest of Algiers. Upon return to the base, a new commander, captain Guido Guidi, was appointed.

On June 11, 1942, the submarine was sent along with four other submarines (Onice, Ascianghi, Aradam and Dessiè) to patrol the triangle between Malta, Pantelleria and Lampedusa with the task of interception of a British convoy, part of Operation Harpoon. Corallo did not, however, sight any enemy ships.

In October 1942 she was sent to patrol an area south of the Balearic Islands.

In November 1942 after the launch of Operation Torch she was deployed to patrol an area off Bizerta. Corallo also penetrated into Philippeville harbor, but there were no ships to attack.

In early December she was deployed together with Alagi, Argento, Bronzo, Galatea, Porfido, Volframio, Mocenigo, Diaspro and Malachite in the western Mediterranean, as a defensive screen protecting Axis convoys to Tunis.

On December 10, 1942, Corallo sailed from Cagliari to patrol an area between Bona and Bizerta with a task of trying to penetrate Bougie harbor during the night of December 13 and destroying any ships she would have found there. After the departure, Corallo was never heard from again.

After the end of the war, from British records, it was established that on the night of December 13, 1942, Corallo 14 miles from Bougie, was spotted and attacked by four British escorts (HMS Enchantress, HMS Fleetwood, HMS Velox, HMS Venomous) from the KMS-4 convoy, sailing from Gibraltar to Algiers. Corallo was depth charged, damaged and forced to surface. At this point, according to some sources, Corallo tried to engage HMS Enchantress with her deck gun, but the British sloop accelerated and rammed the submarine. While HMS Enchantress suffered serious collision damage even to her inner structures, Corallo had the worst of it, and sunk with all hands (commander Guidi, 5 officers, and 43 other crew members) in the position 36°58′N 05°07′E.
