= HMS P47 =

Submarine of the Royal Navy

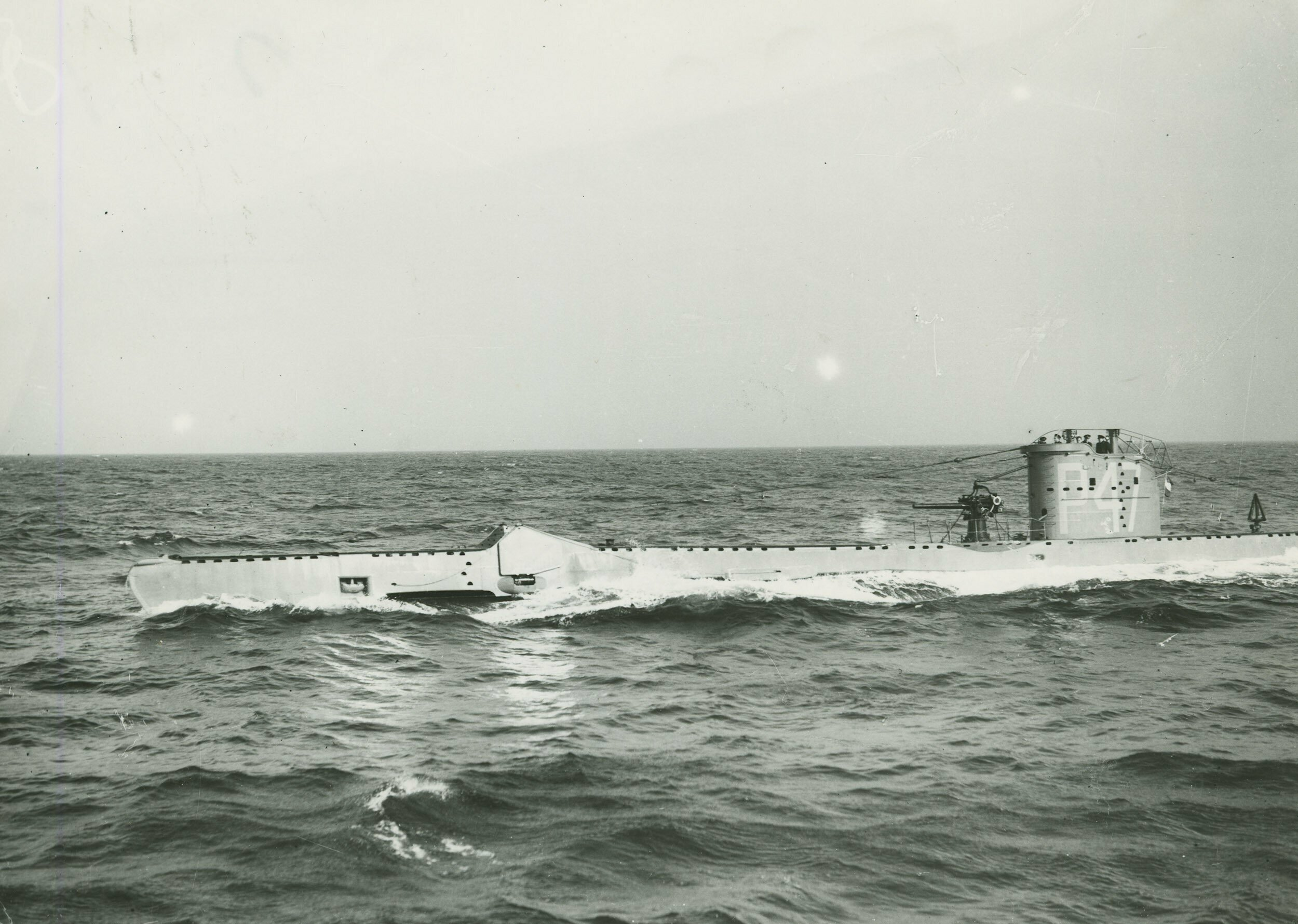
- HMS P47 in Scotland in 1942; note the large 'P47' on her conning tower

History

United Kingdom
- Name: HMS P47
- Builder: Vickers Armstrongs, Barrow-in-Furness
- Laid down: 19 November 1941
- Launched: 27 July 1942
- Fate: Transferred to Royal Netherlands Navy

Netherlands
- Name: HNLMS Dolfijn
- Commissioned: 8 October 1942
- Decommissioned: December 1946
- Fate: Scrapped 1952

General characteristics
- Class & type: U-class submarine
- Displacement: Surfaced – 540 tons standard, 630 tons full load; Submerged – 730 tons
- Length: 58.22 m (191.0 ft)
- Beam: 4.9 m (16 ft)
- Draught: 4.62 m (15.2 ft)
- Propulsion: Two shaft diesel-electric; Two Paxman Ricardo diesel generators + electric motors; 615 / 825 hp
- Speed: 11.25 kn (20.84 km/h; 12.95 mph) surfaced; 10 kn (19 km/h; 12 mph) submerged
- Complement: 27–31
- Armament: Four bow internal 21 inch (533 mm) torpedo tubes; 8–10 torpedoes; One 3-inch (76 mm) gun

HMS P47 was a Royal Navy U-class submarine built by Vickers-Armstrongs. She was transferred to the Royal Netherlands Navy before completion and renamed HNLMS Dolfijn.

== Career ==
=== September 1942 ― February 1943 ===
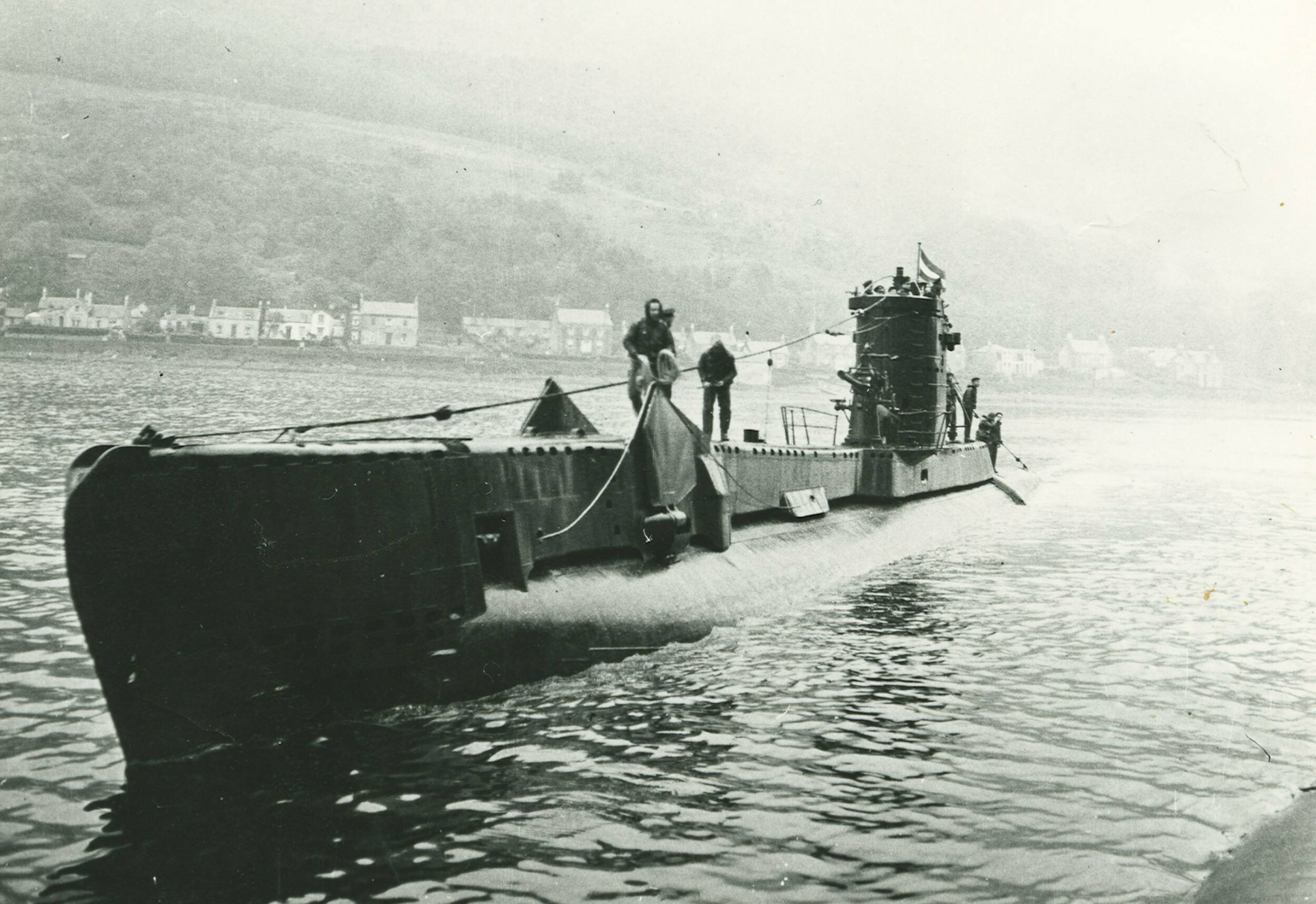
Under the Dutch flag as Dolfijn in 1942

Dolfijn spent the time between September 1942 and January 1943 carrying out trials with the 3rd Flotilla, in Holy Loch. In January she was assigned to the 8th Flotilla, at Algiers, and between November and December 1943, to the 10th Flotilla, at Malta. Whilst on her first war patrol she attacked a so far unidentified German submarine but missed her. On 9 February 1943, she torpedoed and sank the Italian Perla-class submarine Malachite near Cape Spartivento, Sardinia, Italy. She went on to sink the Italian merchant ship Egle, the Italian auxiliary patrol vessel V50 / Adalia, the Italian sailing vessel Stefano Galleano and four other sailing vessels, including the Greek Hydrea and Theonie, as well as two small German vessels.

She also damaged the Italian merchantmen Humanitas and Sabia, and launched unsuccessful attacks against the German merchant vessels Oria and Leda (the former Italian Leopardi). The attack on Leda was foiled by the escorting German destroyer TA14. Dolfijn also torpedoed the wreck of the French merchant ship Dalny and attacked a small convoy with gunfire, firing 16 rounds and hitting the barge Vidi twice. Dolfijn was forced to break off the action and submerge due to swift return fire.

=== December 1943 ― May 1952 ===
Between December 1943 and March 1944, Dolfijn was part of the 1st Flotilla, at Beirut. She eventually returned to the UK with convoys and was refitted at Dundee. After the war, she became a training boat for the technische opleiding (TOKM) in Amsterdam between 1947 and 1952. She was decommissioned and nominally returned to the Royal Navy but was broken up in the Netherlands in May 1952.
