= HMS Enchantress (L56) =

Sloop of the Royal Navy

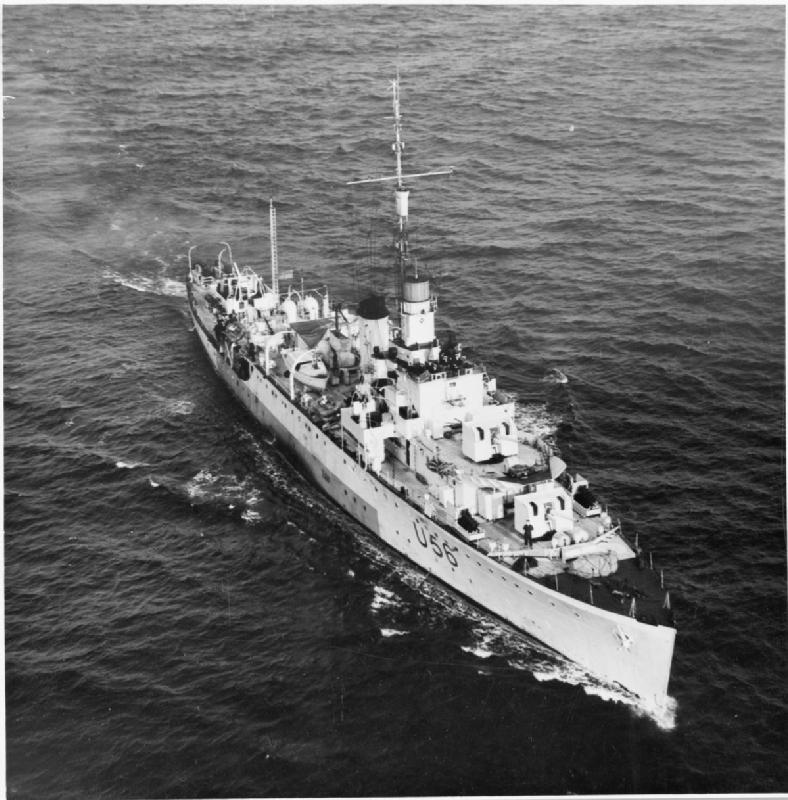
- HMS Enchantress in April 1945

History

United Kingdom
- Name: Bittern: re-named Enchantress in 1935
- Builder: John Brown & Company, Clydebank
- Laid down: 9 March 1934
- Launched: 21 October 1934
- Commissioned: 8 April 1935
- Decommissioned: May 1946
- Identification: Pennant number: L56
- Fate: Sold for scrap 1952

General characteristics
- Class & type: Bittern-class sloop
- Displacement: 1,085 tons
- Length: 282 ft (86 m)
- Beam: 37 ft (11 m)
- Draught: 10 ft 10 in (3.30 m)
- Propulsion: Geared steam turbines on two shafts, 3,300 hp
- Speed: 18.75-knot (34.73 km/h)
- Complement: 128
- Armament: As built: 2 × 4.7 inch guns; 3 × 3-pdr saluting gun; War service: 4 × 4.7 inch guns; 1 × 3 in HA gun; 4 × 20 mm AA cannon; 60 × Depth charges

HMS Enchantress (L56) was a Bittern-class sloop, built for the British Royal Navy. She was the lead ship of her class, being laid down as Bittern, but renamed as Enchantress before being launched by Lady Jean Alice Elaine Cochrane. She was active during the Second World War, serving mainly as a convoy escort, and was a successful anti-submarine warfare vessel, being credited with the destruction of an Italian submarine in 1942.

== Construction ==
Laid down as Bittern on 9 March 1934 by John Brown of Clydebank, this ship, the first of her class, was one of a series of general purpose vessels that could be employed as escorts in time of war. She was intended for use as an Admiralty yacht, and renamed Enchantress (taking the name of the previous vessel in this role) before launching on 21 October 1934. She completed on 4 April 1935 and commissioned four days later.

== Service history ==
In September, 1936, during the Spanish Civil War, while the Royal Navy was helping to evacuate British and other nationals, Enchantress, as Admiralty Yacht and carrying the new First Lord, Sir Samuel Hoare, visited the Mediterranean Fleet in Malta. Following the abdication of King Edward VIII due to his desire to marry US divorcee Wallis Simpson, Enchantress was designated as the Royal Navy ship to take the now Duke of Windsor from Portsmouth to France. However, its name was felt to be too provocative under the circumstances and it was replaced by another ship.

At the outbreak of hostilities in September 1939 Enchantress was allocated to convoy escort duty, coming under the direction of Western Approaches Command. In this role Enchantress was engaged in all the duties performed by escort ships; protecting convoys, searching for and attacking U-boats which attacked ships in convoy, and rescuing survivors. In the six-year Atlantic campaign Enchantress escorted more than 100 trade convoys, mostly on the Gibraltar and South Atlantic routes, ensuring the safe and timely arrival of more than 3,000 ships.

Enchantress was involved in three convoy battles during 1940, and a fourth in 1941, all on the North Atlantic route. In July 1940, while escorting OB 188, the convoy came under attack, losing four ships to U-34. In October SC 6 had three ships sunk and one damaged by two U-boats; in November SC 11 lost seven ships in one night to U-100. In February 1941 OB 322 lost four ships to U-47. Two other convoys escorted by Enchantress were attacked, losing three ships, but she was not present at the time; two other convoys lost ships after dispersal.

In May 1941 Enchantress docked for a refit, and installation of Hedgehog, a new anti-submarine weapon, which she was first to trial. Following this Enchantress was assigned to the South Atlantic route, taking convoys to and from Freetown in Sierra Leone. In January 1942 she was fitted with HF/DF radio-detection gear. In September she was assigned to the escort force for Operation Torch. In December, while escorting KMS 4, Enchantress engaged and destroyed the Italian submarine Corallo off the coast of Algeria.

Returning to the Atlantic in 1943, Enchantress continued escort duty on the Freetown route, until recalled in May 1945 for refit and deployment to the Pacific. In August she was en route to join the British Pacific Fleet when the Japanese surrender took place.

In 1946 Enchantress returned to the UK and paid off; she was disarmed and sold into merchant service as Lady Enchantress. In 1952 she was discarded and sold for scrap.

== Successes ==
During her service Enchantress was credited with the destruction of one U-boat (enemy submarine):

Date	U-boat	Type	Location	Notes
13 December 1942	Corallo	Perla class	Mediterranean Sea, off Bougie, Algeria; 37°58′N 05°07′E	detected by Enchantress while attacking convoy KMS 4; depth-charged, forced to surface, attacked by gunfire and rammed.
