= Italian submarine Iride =

Submarine of the Royal Italian Navy

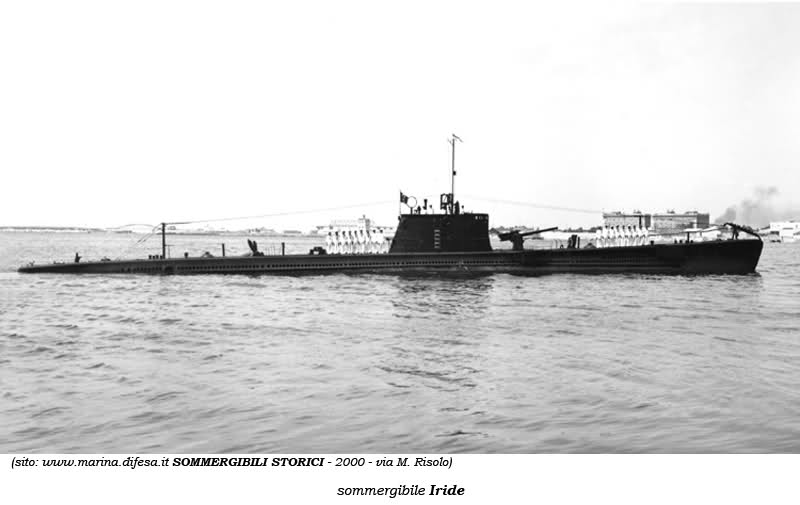
- RIN Iride

History

Kingdom of Italy
- Name: Iride
- Builder: OTO, Muggiano
- Laid down: 3 September 1935
- Launched: 30 July 1936
- Commissioned: 6 November 1936
- Fate: Sunk by HMS Eagle, 22 August 1940

General characteristics
- Class & type: Perla-class submarine
- Displacement: 622.57 tonnes (613 long tons) standard; 696.0 tonnes (685 long tons) normal (surfaced); 852.5 tonnes (839 long tons) normal (submerged)
- Length: 60.18 m (197 ft 5 in)
- Beam: 6.454 m (21 ft 2.1 in)
- Draft: 4.724 m (15 ft 6.0 in)
- Installed power: 1,200 bhp (890 kW) (diesels); 800 hp (600 kW) (electric motors)
- Propulsion: Diesel-electric; 2 × FIAT diesel engines; 2 × CRDA electric engines
- Speed: 14 knots (26 km/h; 16 mph) surfaced; 7.5 knots (13.9 km/h; 8.6 mph) submerged
- Range: 5,200 nmi (9,600 km; 6,000 mi) at 8 knots (15 km/h; 9.2 mph) surfaced; 74 nmi (137 km; 85 mi) at 4 knots (7.4 km/h; 4.6 mph) submerged
- Test depth: 80 m (260 ft)
- Complement: 44 (4 officers + 40 non-officers and sailors)
- Armament: 6 × 533 mm (21 in) torpedo tubes (4 bow, 2 stern); 1 × 100 mm (4 in) / 47 caliber deck gun; 2 × 1 – 13.2 mm (0.52 in) anti-aircraft guns

Italian submarine Iride was a Perla-class submarine built for the Royal Italian Navy (Regia Marina) during the 1930s. Originally, she was named Iris until July 1936, but was renamed shortly before her launch.

== Design and description ==
The Perla-class submarines were essentially repeats of the preceding Sirena class, with some exceptions which were upgrades from the Sirenas. Among them were enlargement of the false tower at the top, more modern engines, installation of a radiogoniometer that could be controlled from inside the ship. Improvements and the installation of new air conditioning equipment meant a slight increase in displacement, and increase in the fuel stowage also increased the autonomy of these boats compared to the previous series. Their designed full load displacement was 695 metric tons (684 long tons) surfaced and 855 metric tons (841 long tons) submerged, but varied somewhat depending on the boat and the builder. The submarines were 197 feet 6 inches (60.20 m) long, had a beam of 21 feet (6.4 m) and a draft of 15 feet (4.6 m) to 15 feet 5 inches (4.70 m).

For surface running, the boats were powered by two diesel engines, each driving one propeller shaft with overall power of 675–750 hp (503–559 kW). When submerged each propeller was driven by a 400-horsepower (298 kW) electric motor. They could reach 14 knots (26 km/h; 16 mph) on the surface and 7.5 knots (13.9 km/h; 8.6 mph) underwater. On the surface, the Perla class had a range of 5,200 nautical miles (9,600 km; 6,000 mi) at 8 knots (15 km/h; 9.2 mph), submerged, they had a range of 74 nmi (137 km; 85 mi) at 4 knots (7.4 km/h; 4.6 mph).

The boats were armed with six internal 53.3 cm (21.0 in) torpedo tubes, four in the bow and two in the stern. One reload torpedo was carried for each tube, for a total of twelve. They were also armed with one 100 mm (4 in) deck gun for combat on the surface. The light anti-aircraft armament consisted of one or two pairs of 13.2 mm (0.52 in) machine guns.

In July 1940 Iride was retained by Decima Flottiglia MAS to be converted into a submarine to carry Siluro a Lenta Corsa (SLC) manned torpedoes. She was fitted with four SLC units, two placed side by side aft, and two on her bow, the submarine's deck gun was also removed to accommodate SLC units and the tower was modified to better adapt for the new role. These SLC cylinders were able to withstand depths up to 30 meters.

== Construction and career ==
Iride was built by OTO at their shipyard in Muggiano, laid on 3 September 1935, launched on 30 July 1936 and completed on 6 November 1936.

After delivery, Iride was assigned to the 12th Squadron (I Submarine Group) based at La Spezia. After a brief training, in 1937 and 1938 she carried out long endurance cruises in the Dodecanese, Mediterranean Sea and around North African coast.

Iride secretly participated in the Spanish Civil War, being a part of two incidents that strained Italo-British relations. She carried out a mission from 24 August to 5 September 1937 under the command of Junio Valerio Borghese. On 26 August, Iride arrived at her designated area between Ibiza and Cape San Antonio. During the patrol she attempted attacks eight times, but only fired on two of those. In the evening of 29 August, she sighted a cargo ship heading towards Valencia, and attacked it twice, the second time from 600 m (1,969 ft), and both were unsuccessful. At 20:45 on 30 August 1937, while traveling on the surface, she sighted British destroyer HMS Havock steaming from Valencia to Gibraltar, and mistaking it for a Spanish naval ship of the Churruca class, launched a 450mm torpedo from 700 m (2,297 ft) at 20:52. Havock managed to avoid the torpedo with a sharp turn to the starboard, and then went on to search for the submarine using her sonar. However, the sonar showed a different position than where the submarine was sighted, and Havock proceeded to launch depth charges on the sonar location. British destroyers HMS Active, HMS Hyperion and HMS Hotspur, and a cruiser HMS Galatea joined in, and continued the attack for nine hours. Iride hiding at a great depth managed to survive and did not sustain any serious damage. During the attack, she did accidentally surface and was identified by the British as an Italian submarine.

Following the incident, in September 1937 the Nyon Conference was called by France and Great Britain to address the "underwater piracy" conducted against merchant traffic in the Mediterranean Sea. On 14 September, an agreement was signed establishing British and French patrol zones around Spain (with a total of 60 destroyers and aircraft employed) to counteract aggressive behavior by submarines. Italy was not directly accused, but had to comply with the agreement and suspend the underwater operations.

Under pressure from Franco's regime, Italy decided to transfer four more submarines (in addition to Archimede and Evangelista Torricelli already being operated by the Falangists) to the Spanish Legion (Legión Española or Tercio de Extranjeros). Iride was one of the four boats chosen for the transfer. On 23 September 1937 Iride arrived at Soller on Mallorca. She was placed under the direct command of Spanish Admiral Francisco Moreno, was renamed Gonzalez Lopez and assigned pennant number L3. However, Iride retained her commander (captain Junio Valerio Borghese), senior officers and Italian crew, but they had to wear Spanish uniforms and insignia.

The other three Italian submarines transferred to Tercio were Onice (Aguilar Tablada), Galileo Galilei (General Mola II) and Galileo Ferraris (General Sanjurjo II). All four were based at Soller. During her "legionary" career Iride carried out two missions, one in October 1937, leaving on 24 October and returning eight days later, and another one in January 1938, leaving on 14 January 1938 and finishing nine days later. During her second mission, Iride again patrolled along the Spanish coast, and attempted an attack twice, on 19 January and 22 January 1938, by launching four torpedoes, but both attacks were unsuccessful. In February 1938 she returned home, as Italy withdrew their submarines from Spanish service due to international pressure. Iride was assigned to 14th Squadron (I Submarine Group) based at La Spezia.

In 1938 and 1939 she spent time at the Red Sea base of Massawa together with Onice and Berillo. She returned to Italy in 1939 and was assigned to 13th Squadron (I Submarine Group) based at La Spezia.

After Italy's entrance into the war, Iride under command of captain Francesco Brunetti on 14 June 1940 was deployed on her first war mission to patrol off Toulon. She returned to La Spezia after a few days without sighting any enemy vessels. During her second mission, on 23 June, Iride, while patrolling in the Gulf of Lion, sighted a ship travelling to Marseille. She launched two torpedoes but failed to hit the target.

In July 1940 Iride was chosen for conversion to SLC submarine to attempt the first attack against British naval base in Alexandria. Work was finished in early August, and on 12 August 1940 Iride departed La Spezia and after a brief stop in Trapani on 16 August, reached the Bay of Menelao in the Gulf of Bomba of the coast of Cyrenaica together with torpedo boat Calipso, which carried the SLC crew, and the support ship Monte Gargano.

During the night of 21 August the SLCs were loaded onto the submarine's deck, and a test navigation was to be carried out the next morning. A reconnaissance plane flew by in the morning of 22 August 1940 and spotted Italian ships in the bay. Around noon three Fairey Swordfish torpedo bombers from the aircraft carrier HMS Eagle that were temporarily based at Maaten Baggush airfield in the western desert were launched and attacked Iride and the other ships while they were performing a diving test with four human torpedoes. One of the aircraft released a torpedo from about 200 metres (656 ft) and after a few seconds Iride got hit amidships, broke in two, and quickly sank in 15 meters of water, followed shortly by Monte Gargano which was also hit by a torpedo.

The flight leader, Captain Oliver Patch, Royal Marines, sank Iride, while John Wellham and Lieutenant Neville Cheesman attacked the other two ships. A few crew members were rescued with the support of the human torpedo operators; most died in the sinking. John Wellham, low on fuel and wounded, returned to his desert base and was awarded the Distinguished Service Cross. Patch received the Distinguished Service Order, while Cheesman, Sub-Lieutenant Frederick Stovin-Bradford and Acting Sub-Lieutenant Gordon Woodley also received the Distinguished Service Cross, and Petty Officer Alfred Marsh the Distinguished Service Medal. Patch and Wellham would later fly in the attack on Italian fleet at Taranto Harbour.

While examining the wreckage, operators discovered that two non-commissioned officers and seven sailors were still alive trapped in one of the aft compartments of the submarine. The situation was critical; the compartment was slowly flooding and the escape door was jammed distorted by the explosion. After several hours of work, all seven men managed to get to the surface with the help of divers, however two men later died of embolism because they did not follow the instructions. Overall, Iride lost 35 men (3 officers, 9 non-officers and 23 sailors) with 17 survivors. All four SLCs were recovered with minor damage, and brought back to La Spezia by Calipso. The first assault operation had ended in disaster.
