= Italian submarine Malachite =

Italian submarine

History

Kingdom of Italy
- Name: Malachite
- Namesake: Malachite
- Builder: OTO, Muggiano
- Laid down: 31 August 1935
- Launched: 15 July 1936
- Commissioned: 6 November 1936
- Fate: Sunk, 9 February 1943

General characteristics
- Class & type: Perla-class submarine
- Displacement: 622.57 tonnes (613 long tons) standard; 696.0 tonnes (685 long tons) normal (surfaced); 852.5 tonnes (839 long tons) normal (submerged)
- Length: 60.18 m (197 ft 5 in)
- Beam: 6.454 m (21 ft 2.1 in)
- Draft: 4.724 m (15 ft 6.0 in)
- Installed power: 1,200 bhp (890 kW) (diesels); 800 hp (600 kW) (electric motors)
- Propulsion: Diesel-electric; 2 × Tosi diesel engines; 2 × Marelli electric engines
- Speed: 14 knots (26 km/h; 16 mph) surfaced; 7.5 knots (13.9 km/h; 8.6 mph) submerged
- Range: 5,200 nmi (9,600 km; 6,000 mi) at 8 knots (15 km/h; 9.2 mph) surfaced; 74 nmi (137 km; 85 mi) at 4 knots (7.4 km/h; 4.6 mph) submerged
- Test depth: 80 m (260 ft)
- Complement: 44 (4 officers + 40 non-officers and sailors)
- Armament: 6 × 533 mm (21 in) torpedo tubes (4 bow, 2 stern); 1 × 100 mm (4 in) / 47 caliber deck gun; 2 x 1 – 13.2 mm (0.52 in) anti-aircraft guns

Italian submarine Malachite was a Perla-class submarine built for the Royal Italian Navy (Regia Marina) during the 1930s. She was named after a gemstone malachite.

== Design and description ==
The Perla-class submarines were essentially repeats of the preceding Sirena class. The modifications that were made compared to the boats of the previous series were mostly of upgrade nature. Among them were enlargement of the false tower at the top, more modern engines, installation of a radiogoniometer that could be controlled from inside the ship. Improvements and the installation of new air conditioning equipment meant a slight increase in displacement, and increase in the fuel stowage also increased the autonomy of these boats compared to the previous series. Their designed full load displacement was 695 metric tons (684 long tons) surfaced and 855 metric tons (841 long tons) submerged, but varied somewhat depending on the boat and the builder. The submarines were 197 feet 6 inches (60.20 m) long, had a beam of 21 feet (6.4 m) and a draft of 15 feet (4.6 m) to 15 feet 5 inches (4.70 m).

For surface running, the boats were powered by two diesel engines, each driving one propeller shaft with overall power of 675–750 hp (503–559 kW). When submerged each propeller was driven by a 400-horsepower (298 kW) electric motor. They could reach 14 knots (26 km/h; 16 mph) on the surface and 7.5 knots (13.9 km/h; 8.6 mph) underwater. On the surface, the Perla class had a range of 5,200 nautical miles (9,600 km; 6,000 mi) at 8 knots (15 km/h; 9.2 mph), submerged, they had a range of 74 nmi (137 km; 85 mi) at 4 knots (7.4 km/h; 4.6 mph).

The boats were armed with six internal 53.3 cm (21.0 in) torpedo tubes, four in the bow and two in the stern. One reload torpedo was carried for each tube, for a total of twelve. They were also armed with one 100 mm (4 in) deck gun for combat on the surface. The light anti-aircraft armament consisted of one or two pairs of 13.2 mm (0.52 in) machine guns.

== Construction and career ==
Malachite was built by OTO at their shipyard in Muggiano, laid on 31 August 1935, launched on 15 July 1936 and completed on 6 November 1936.

After delivery, Malachite was assigned to the 13th Squadron based at La Spezia. In 1937 she undertook a training campaign near the Greek coast, in the Dodecanese and around Tobruk. During the Spanish Civil War, the submarine conducted a special mission between 24 August and 4 September 1937, and on 29 August she was subject to an anti-submarine search and attack.

Between 1938 and 1940 Malachite was training and exercising for long periods around Tobruk. Upon her return to Italy, she was assigned to 47th Squadron (IV Submarine Group) based at Taranto. At the time of Italy's entrance into World War II, Malachite was reassigned to the X Submarine Group based at Augusta. Her commander at the time was captain Renato d'Elia.

From 20 to 27 June 1940 she was deployed to patrol an area north of Mallorca. On 24 June, she detected a convoy at long distance, but could not attack. Upon arrival from this mission, she underwent several months of upgrades and repairs. During this time commander D'Elia was replaced by captain Enzo Zanni.

In the night between 12 and 13 November 1940 she patrolled in the Gulf of Taranto.

From 18 to 21 December 1940 Malachite patrolled northeast of Derna. On 15 December, while en route to the area of operations, she was attacked by an aircraft but the attack was beaten back with her anti-aircraft weapons.

During the night 27 January 1941 she patrolled in the Strait of Messina.

From 9 to 18 February 1941 Malachite patrolled off Bardia. On 14 February she attempted an attack on an unidentified warship, but fails to launch torpedoes due to the high speed of the target.

From 15 to 22 March 1941 she was deployed in the Kythira Strait. On the night of 19 March, Malachite sighted a cruiser escorted by several destroyers. At 01:19 she launched two torpedoes but they both miss. Malachite was forced to dive and undergo lengthy depth charge attack.

From 10 to 18 April 1941 she was posted northeast of the Gulf of Sollum. At 23:37 on 14 April Malachite sighted a large convoy but was prevented from attacking it due to preemptive action by the escorts.

On 20 May 1941 Malachite together with numerous other submarines was deployed to an area between Crete, Alexandria and Sollum, to support the German invasion of Crete (Operation Merkur). Malachite's area operation was south of the island of Gaidaro.

On the night of 19 June 1941 while patrolling off Crete, Malachite sighted a British cruiser escorted by a destroyer. She launched two torpedoes at the target, but they both missed her by the stern.

From 3 to 14 July 1941 she patrolled north of Ras Azzaz. At 20:00 on 3 July Malachite sighted a large cruiser (possibly HMS Phoebe) escorted by two destroyers, and immediately launched a torpedo. There was an explosion heard, but there is no reports of this attack in British post-war documents, although some believe an escort was hit.

From 25 September to 5 October 1941 she patrolled off Ras Aamer.

From 20 to 27 January 1942 she again patrolled of Ras Aamer.

From 11 to 23 February 1942 she was deployed to an area off the coast of Cyrenaica.

From 8 to 21 April 1942 again she was again deployed off the coast of Cyrenaica.

From 1 to 9 June 1942 and then again from 15 to 18 June 1942 Malachite was posted northwest of Algiers. She was then relocated to patrol off Cape Blanc from 22 to 24 June.

On 16 July 1942 Malachite was sent to patrol along the Tunisian coast, however had to return to the base the next day due to engine failure. During the period of repairs and maintenance a new commander was appointed, as captain Alpinolo Cinti took over the command.

From 20 to 26 November 1942 Malachite was deployed along the Algerian coast. At 4:11 on 24 November during a raid on Philippeville's harbor she launched two torpedoes at three merchants. An explosion was heard, and at 04:15 she launched a two more torpedoes at a big tanker. Again, explosions were heard, but British post-war documents are silent on the sustained damage. The submarine returned to Cagliari where it would be temporarily assigned to.

From 16 to 24 December 1942 she patrolled an area between the island of La Galite and Cape de Fer. She patrolled off the island of La Galite on 4 and 5 January 1943 again.

On 21 January Malachite was deployed to an area between Cape Carbon and Cape Bougaroun. At 4:55 on 22 January she sighted an incoming convoy heading to Bona, Algeria. At 05:18 she fired four torpedoes, and dove to avoid an attack by the escorts. Two explosions were heard, but again British post-war documents contain no mention of this attack.

On 2 February 1943 Malachite left Cagliari with a group of 11 commandos from the battalion "San Marco" whose goal was to blow up a railway bridge in El Kejur, Algeria. In the evening of 6 February, the commandos landed by Cape Matifu, while the submarine remained on station waiting for their return. An explosion was heard some time later, and a signal rocket was launched indicating success of the operation. There was gunfire heard on the beach shortly thereafter, and none of the commandos returned. The submarine waited until 6:30 on 7 February and then left to avoid being discovered by the enemy escorts.

Malachite was heading to her base in Cagliari, when already in view of the Sardinian coast she was spotted by the Dutch submarine HNLMS Dolfijn in the morning of 9 February 1943. At approximately 11:00, Dolfijn launched a salvo of 4 torpedoes at Malachite. The Italian submarine managed to avoid three of them by deftly maneuvering, but the fourth one hit her on the stern, and she sank within a minute, taking down 35 crew with her. Commander Cinti, three other officers, and nine NCOs and sailors managed to escape.

The wreck of Malachite was located in September 1999 at a depth of 117 to 124 meters.
