= Nyon Conference =

1937 diplomatic conference in Switzerland

- An "informal picture" published in The Times of members of the British delegation. Anthony Eden sits to the right, accompanied by Lord Chatfield and Sir Robert Vansittart.
- Date: 10 September 1937– 14 September 1937
- Cities: Nyon, Switzerland
- Participants: Bulgaria; Egypt; France; Greece; Romania; Turkey; United Kingdom; USSR; Yugoslavia

The Nyon Conference was a diplomatic conference held in Nyon, Switzerland, in September 1937 to address attacks on international shipping in the Mediterranean Sea during the Spanish Civil War. The conference was convened in part because Italy had been carrying out unrestricted submarine warfare, although the final conference agreement did not accuse Italy directly; instead, the attacks were referred to as "piracy" by an unidentified body. Italy was not officially at war, nor did any submarine identify itself. The conference was designed to strengthen non-intervention in the Spanish Civil War. The United Kingdom and France led the conference, which was also attended by Bulgaria, Egypt, Greece, Romania, Turkey, the Soviet Union and Yugoslavia.

The first agreement, signed on 14 September 1937, included plans to counterattack aggressive submarines. Naval patrols were established; the United Kingdom and France were to patrol most of the western Mediterranean and parts of the east, and the other signatories were to patrol their own waters. Italy was to be allowed to join the agreement and patrol the Tyrrhenian Sea if it wished. A second agreement followed three days later, applying similar provisions to surface ships. Italy and Germany did not attend, although the former took up naval patrols in November. In marked contrast to the actions of the Non-Intervention Committee and the League of Nations, this conference succeeded in preventing attacks by submarines.

Nyon has been characterised as "an appeasers paradise. The fiction that attacks on merchant shipping in the Mediterranean was the fault of 'pirates unknown' was fully indulged. [It] preserved the naval status quo in the Mediterranean until the end of the Spanish Civil War: the Francoists received whatever they wanted, the Republicans got very little."

== Context and organisation ==
The Non-Intervention Committee, a group of twenty-four nations set up in 1936 and based in London, had attempted to restrict the flow of weapons to the parties of the Spanish Civil War. For the United Kingdom, it formed part of the policy of appeasement towards Germany and Italy and aimed at preventing a proxy war – with Italy and Germany supporting Franco's Nationalist Coalition on one side and the Soviet Union supporting the Republican faction on the other – from escalating into a major pan-European conflict. An Anglo-Italian "Gentleman's Agreement" had been signed on 2 January 1937, with each party respecting the rights of the other in the Mediterranean and aimed at improving Anglo-Italian relations. In May 1937, Neville Chamberlain succeeded Stanley Baldwin as British Prime Minister, and adopted a new policy of dealing directly with Germany and Italy. The British believed they could convince Italy to abandon Germany through appeasement.

Under a Non-Intervention Committee plan, neutral observers were posted to Spanish ports and borders. The plan also assigned zones of patrol to the United Kingdom, France, Germany and Italy, and patrols began in April. Following attacks on the German cruiser Leipzig on 15 and 18 June, Germany and Italy withdrew from the patrols. The United Kingdom and France offered to replace Germany and Italy in patrols of their sections, but the latter powers believed these patrols would be too partial. The British Admiralty proposed four plans in response to attacks on British shipping, favouring sending significant naval resources to the Mediterranean as the best solution; previous control measures had been widely evaded. As suspected by the other powers, Italy was behind some of these attacks. Whilst officially being at peace, the Italian leadership had ordered the commencement of unrestricted submarine warfare, referred to in discussion as a campaign of piracy without mention of Italy. These plans would be the basis for a Mediterranean meeting, suggested by French Foreign Minister Yvon Delbos. Meanwhile, on the night of 31 August to 1 September, the Italian submarine Iride unsuccessfully attacked the British destroyer Havock with torpedoes, between the Gulf of Valencia and the Balearic Islands, strengthening British Foreign Secretary Anthony Eden's sceptical stance towards Italy. The attack led the British representative in Rome to protest to the Italian Minister of Foreign Affairs, but without response.

Up to 60,000 Italian volunteers were then operating in Spain, and the removal of foreign nationals was discussed by the Non-Intervention Committee. Italy had made a declaration on 7 January 1937 that it would stop Italian volunteers from fighting in Spain. and put a moratorium on volunteers on 20 January, also agreeing to support limitations on the number of volunteers on the 25th. Italy continued to request that belligerent rights be given to the Nationalists and Republicans, so both would gain the right to search vessels for contraband, thus removing the need for naval patrols. This request was opposed by the United Kingdom, France and the Soviet Union. British recognition of Italian sovereignty over Abyssinia following the Second Italo-Abyssinian War was an important issue during Anglo-Italian discussions in August 1937. Following Eden's disagreement with Chamberlain and Lord Halifax, Leader of the House of Lords and influential politician, over the issue, any agreement recognising Italian sovereignty was postponed until after the planned shipping conference had taken place.

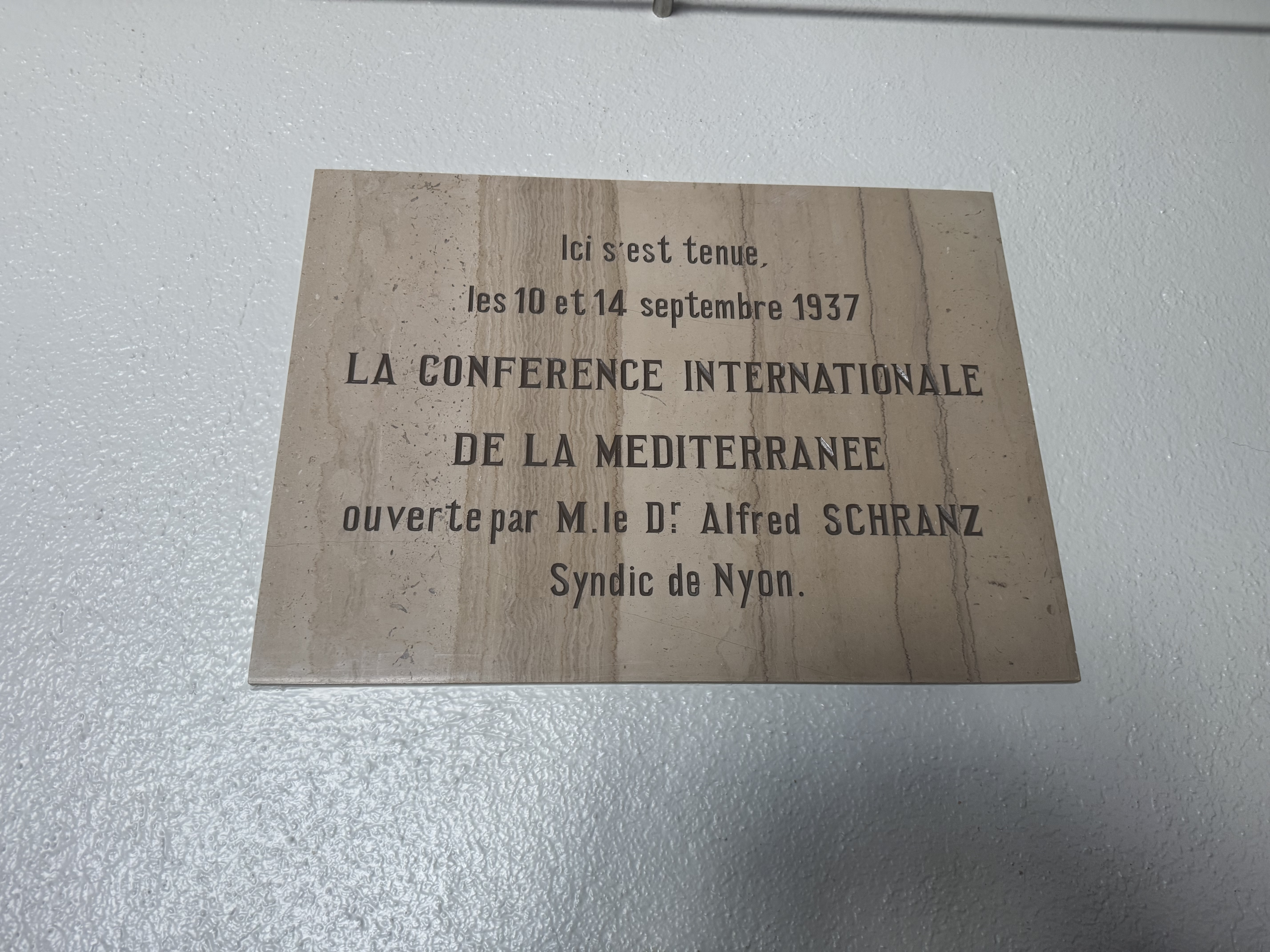
A plaque commemorates the place of the conference at the entrance of today's communal hall of Nyon.

On 5 or 6 September, the British arranged a conference for all parties with a Mediterranean coastline, along with Germany. The conference was to be held at Nyon, Switzerland – Geneva was avoided because Italians associated it with the actions of the League of Nations over the Abyssinian Crisis. The United Kingdom agreed to France's request to extend an invitation to the Soviet Union, but blocked France's attempt to invite a representative from Republican Spain. Portugal expressed surprise at not being invited. Camille Chautemps, the new French Prime Minister, opposed direct intervention on the Spanish question. The Soviet Union accepted the invitation, indicating that it would use the opportunity to blame Italy for the attacks on shipping. The Soviet government formally accused the Italians of sinking two Soviet merchant vessels, the Timiryazev and the Blagoev, an accusation the Italians described as "aggressive and offensive". This was perhaps an attempt by the Soviet Union to push Italy and Germany away from the conference. Germany rejected the invitation, stating that piracy and other issues the conference was to discuss should be handled only by normal meetings of the Non-Intervention Committee, not a conference like Nyon. The United Kingdom and France rejected this suggestion, and continued to prepare for the conference. Soon after, the Italians similarly declined. The Non-Intervention Committee, it said, also had the advantage of including other European powers, notably Poland and Portugal.

== Provisions ==
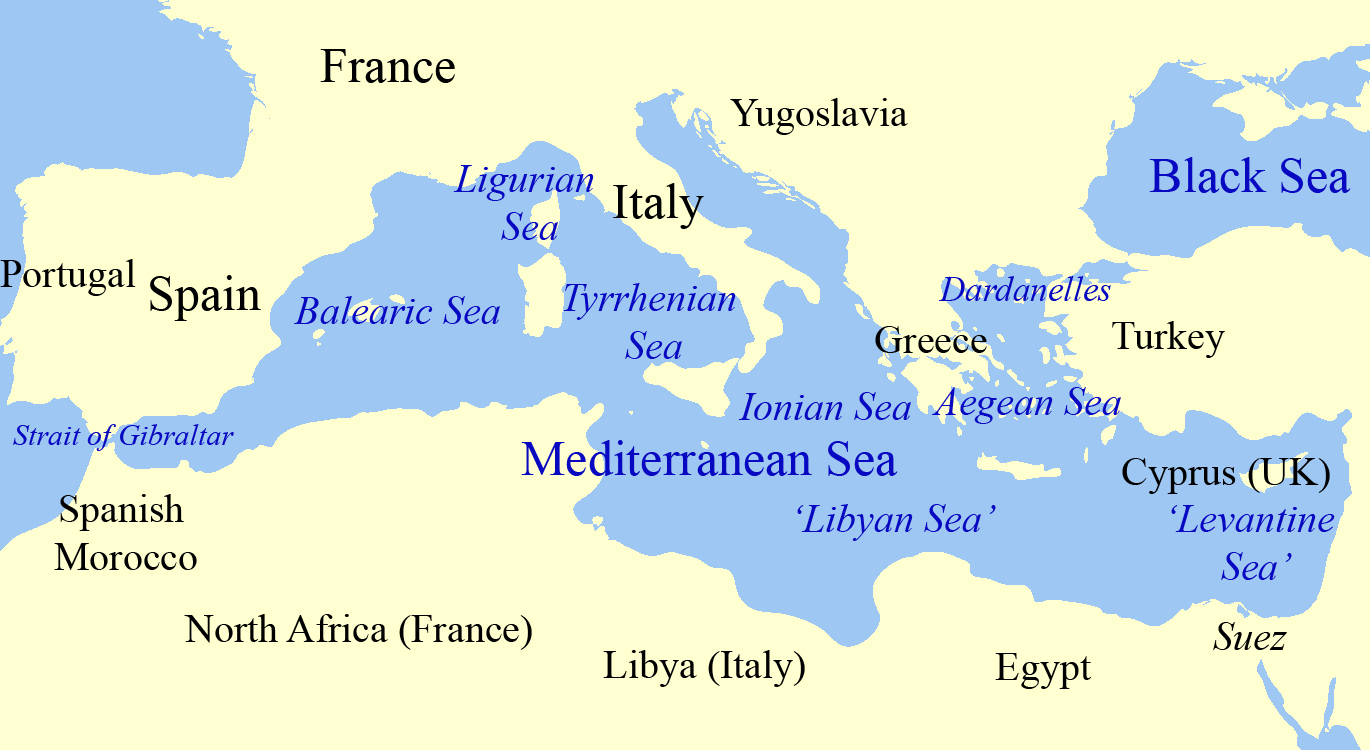
Map of the Mediterranean, showing some of the features referred to at the conference.

British and French naval staffs rejected the idea of a convoy system in draft proposals. The British wanted to curb submarine activity, on the theory that focusing on covert submarine attacks would help avoid confrontation, whereas the French considered surface vessels and aircraft just as important. The French protested at a plan to create multi-nation squadrons, unhappy at the prospect of French ships coming under foreign command. On 8 September, plans were discussed in the British Cabinet, including the setting up of eight groups of three destroyers for the western Mediterranean. Preliminary talks with the French were held on 9 September, and the conference began on the 10th. Proceedings took two forms: discussions between the British and French, and formal meetings of all attending parties. Many of the other nations opposed the participation of the Soviet Navy in the Mediterranean, so the United Kingdom and France agreed to handle Aegean Sea patrols. This was, perhaps surprisingly, accepted by the Soviet Union.

The conference ended on 14 September with the signing of the "Mediterranean Agreement". Signatories were the countries of Bulgaria, Egypt, France, Greece, Romania, Turkey, the United Kingdom, the USSR and Yugoslavia. The agreement noted attacks on neutral shipping by submarines, in contravention of the London Naval Treaty (signed in 1930) and the Submarine Protocol, part of the Second London Naval Treaty (signed in 1936).

The agreement provided that any submarine that attacked neutral shipping was to be sunk if possible, including submarines in the vicinity of a recent attack that were determined to be responsible for the attack. French and British fleets would patrol the seas west of Malta and attack any suspicious submarines, with the division of patrols between the United Kingdom and France to be decided by their governments. Both countries would patrol the high seas and territorial waters of signatory countries in the Mediterranean. The British would provide slightly more than half the 60 destroyers needed, with the French providing the remainder and most of the accompanying aircraft. It was agreed that Italy could participate in patrols of the Tyrrhenian Sea if it wished to do so. In the Eastern Mediterranean, British and French ships would patrol up to the Dardanelles, but not in the Adriatic Sea. In this area, signatory countries would patrol their own territorial waters, and would provide any reasonable assistance to the French and British patrols. The future revision of these provisions, including the way the area had been divided into zones, was specifically allowed. Submarine activity would be banned, subject to two exemptions: travel on the surface accompanied by a surface ship, and activity in certain areas for training purposes. Governments would only allow foreign submarines into each of their territorial waters in extreme situations, such as immediate distress. Merchant shipping would also be advised to stick to particular shipping routes. The agreement repeated the suggestion that Italy join in the proposal. Delbos announced that similar proposals about surface craft would be prepared. The provisions of the agreement would come into force on 20 September. The British and French knew that the secret Italian submarine operations had already been paused, but actions to enforce the conference agreement started at midnight on 19/20 September. The delegates to the agreement were happy; The Times likened them to cricketers, "reviewing their innings, over by over".

The French and British naval staffs moved to Geneva, where a second agreement was signed on 17 September 1937. It extended the rules governing submarine warfare to surface vessels, and had the same signatories. Official versions of both agreements were published in French and English. Several proposals were not implemented: for instance, the British Admiral Ernle Chatfield wanted the Spanish parties to be able to verify that the flag a ship was displaying was correct, thereby preventing attacks on British shipping if Republican ships continued to use the British flag as a means of escape. This would have benefited the Nationalists, and the French insisted that this provision be dropped. Greece and Turkey wanted ships with a clear identifying mark to be excluded, so as to avoid being forced to fire on a German or Italian warship. This was rejected, but an amendment was made allowing nations to issue their preferred orders in their own territorial waters. A suggestion to fire at any attacking aircraft was easily passed. Another suggestion on surface ships (which incorrectly stated no attack had yet been proven) was eventually toughened with the addition of a clause stating aggressors would be attacked, at the request of the French. A Soviet proposal strengthening the effect of the agreement was made.

== Aftermath ==
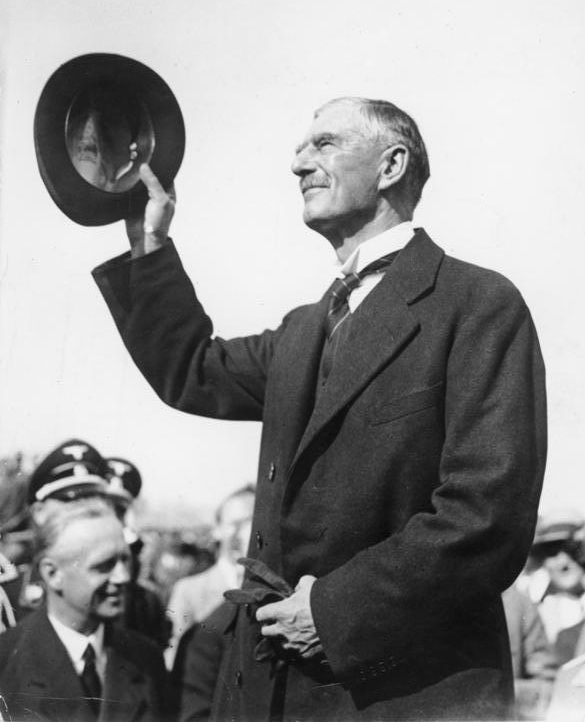
Neville Chamberlain in September 1938

Meanwhile, on 13 September, Italy was invited to join in the agreement. Italy unequivocally rejected it, refusing to patrol the Tyrrhenian Sea. It demanded "absolute parity" with the United Kingdom and France, meaning the same right of patrol in the Mediterranean. Italy subsequently indicated that its refusal would be reversed if such parity was granted. Meanwhile, on the 15th, Benito Mussolini's government sent two submarines to Francisco Franco's National Faction. The Soviet Union refused to use routes patrolled by the Italians; the Turks, Greeks and Yugoslavs refused to let the Italians use their ports. A compromise was signed on 30 September, and Italian patrols started on 10 November. The British government, and in particular Neville Chamberlain, desired better relations with Italy and these were achieved with the signing of the Anglo-Italian Agreements of 1938.

The patrols were a strain on the Royal Navy and the provisions were relaxed with French agreement, effective from January. Submarine activity soon returned and full patrols were resumed in early February. On the whole, submarine activity during this period did not amount to much; patrols were again relaxed in May, and the agreement suspended in August. The success of the conference was in marked contrast to the failure of the Non-Intervention Committee. The Nationalists and Italians switched to using air power against shipping; at least one ship was sunk off the Spanish coast by aircraft in the final months of 1937.

In the United Kingdom, Eden described the submarine attacks as savage. He also noted that attacks on submarines would be restricted to suitably extreme circumstances and that the two parties in the war would still not be able to engage neutral vessels. He was keen to avoid an "Anglo-Franco-Soviet bloc". The British press was in favour of the agreement, although The Times and The Guardian expressed some concerns. British historians have tended to see the Nyon Conference as an important stand against aggression, with some reservations. Christopher Seton-Watson describes it as a "diplomatic victory", but Jill Edwards points out that it failed to achieve a change in Italian policy. The agreement created further divisions between Eden as foreign minister and Neville Chamberlain as prime minister.

Maxim Litvinov, the Soviet representative, was pleased with the outcome. The agreement also allowed for greater military resources to be deployed to the Mediterranean as needed. Litvinov, in particular, stressed the Soviet Union's "indisputable right" to commit naval forces to the Mediterranean (something Germany and Italy had opposed in meetings of the Non-Intervention Committee). He also said he regretted that Spanish merchant shipping had been left out – the other nations believed this would have amounted to formal intervention into the civil war. Aretas Akers-Bouglas, Viscount Chilston and British Ambassador to the Soviet Union, reported that the Soviets considered the conference with "tempered satisfaction", and that they claimed credit for their delegation's role.

Elsewhere, French public opinion was strongly in favour of the outcome of the conference, the only criticism coming from the far left that Republican ships would not receive direct protection. The German mood was restrained, where the press were satisfied by the Soviet exclusion from patrols. In Spain, the Republicans – on the verge of disaster – were largely in favour, and the Nationalists strongly against. The Republicans praised the improved safety of the shipping routes, but were somewhat unhappy that belligerent rights had not been granted to both sides. The Nationalists made several complaints, including one over the route recommended to shipping, but none of these resulted in changes to the agreement. The agreement was welcomed by other members of the League of Nations. Italian historians tend to downplay the importance of the Nyon Conference, often seeing it as a mere extension of the Non-Intervention Committee.

== Sources ==
Books

- Alpert, Michael (1998). A New International History of the Spanish Civil War. Basingstoke, UK: Palgrave Macmillan. ISBN 978-0-312-21043-4.
- Buchanan, Tom (1997). Britain and the Spanish Civil War. Cambridge: Cambridge University Press. ISBN 0-521-45569-3.
- Schindler, Dietrich; Toman, Jiří (1988). The Laws of Armed Conflicts: a Collection of Conventions, Resolutions, and Other Documents. Scientific collection of the Henry Dunant Institute (3rd ed.). Dordrecht, The Netherlands: Martinus Nijhoff. ISBN 90-247-3306-5.
- Stone, Glyn (1997). "Sir Robert Vansittart and Spain, 1931–1941". In Otte, Thomas G.; Pagedas, Constantine A. (eds.). Personalities, war and diplomacy: essays in international history. London: Routledge. ISBN 978-0-7146-4818-7.
- Thomas, Hugh (1961). The Spanish Civil War (1st ed.). London: Eyre and Spottiswoode.

Journals

- S. A. H (7 August 1937). "Spain: the British Compromise Plan". Bulletin of International News. 14 (3). London: Royal Institute of International Affairs: 3–13. ISSN 2044-3986. JSTOR 25639692.
- "The Nyon Conference and its Result". Bulletin of International News. 14 (6). London: Royal Institute of International Affairs: 12–14. 18 September 1937. ISSN 2044-3986. JSTOR 25639708.
- Gretton, Peter (January 1975). "The Nyon Conference – The Naval Aspect". The English Historical Review. 90 (354). London: Oxford University Press: 103–112. doi:10.1093/ehr/xc.cccliv.103. ISSN 0013-8266. JSTOR 567512.
- Frank, Willard C. (August 1987). "The Spanish Civil War and the Coming of the Second World War". The International History Review. 9 (3). Abingdon, Oxfordshire: Taylor & Francis: 368–409. doi:10.1080/07075332.1987.9640449. ISSN 0707-5332. JSTOR 40105814.
- Lammers, Donald N. (Winter 1971). "The Nyon Arrangements of 1937: A success sui generis". Albion: A Quarterly Journal Concerned with British Studies. 3 (4). Denver, Colorado: The North American Conference on British Studies: 163–176. doi:10.2307/4048234. ISSN 0095-1390. JSTOR 4048234.
- Mills, William C. (February 1993). "The Nyon Conference: Neville Chamberlain, Anthony Eden, and the Appeasement of Italy in 1937". The International History Review. 15 (1). Abingdon, Oxfordshire: Taylor & Francis: 1–22. doi:10.1080/07075332.1993.9640636. ISSN 0707-5332. JSTOR 40107260.
