= Italian submarine Perla =

Italian submarine

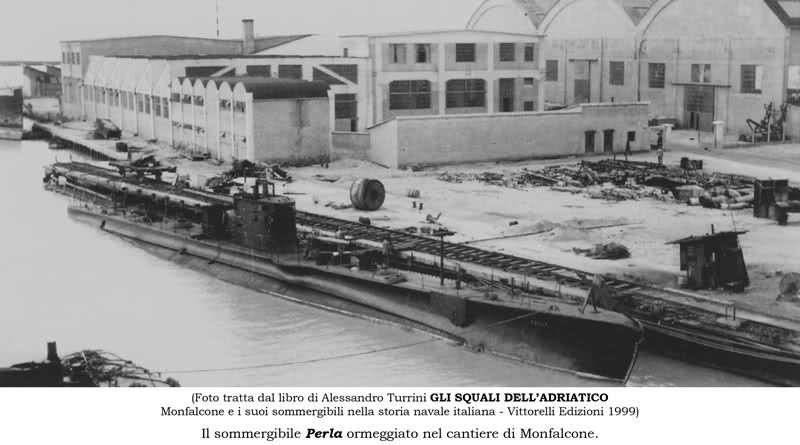
- RIN Perla at Monfalcone

History

Kingdom of Italy
- Name: Perla
- Namesake: Pearl
- Builder: CRDA, Monfalcone
- Laid down: 31 August 1935
- Launched: 3 May 1936
- Commissioned: 8 July 1936
- Fate: Captured, 9 July 1942

History

United Kingdom
- Name: P-712
- Acquired: Captured, 9 July 1942
- Fate: Transferred to the Hellenic Navy, 1943

History

Kingdom of Greece
- Name: Matrizos
- Acquired: 1943
- Fate: Struck off and scrapped, 1947

General characteristics
- Class & type: Perla-class submarine
- Displacement: 626.115 tonnes (616 long tons) standard; 700.54 tonnes (689 long tons) normal (surfaced); 859.69 tonnes (846 long tons) normal (submerged)
- Length: 60.18 m (197 ft 5 in)
- Beam: 6.454 m (21 ft 2.1 in)
- Draft: 4.709 m (15 ft 5.4 in)
- Installed power: 1,500 hp (1,100 kW) (diesels); 800 hp (600 kW) (electric motors)
- Propulsion: Diesel-electric; 2 × FIAT diesel engines; 2 × CRDA electric engines
- Speed: 14 knots (26 km/h; 16 mph) surfaced; 7.5 knots (13.9 km/h; 8.6 mph) submerged
- Range: 5,200 nmi (9,600 km; 6,000 mi) at 8 knots (15 km/h; 9.2 mph) surfaced; 74 nmi (137 km; 85 mi) at 4 knots (7.4 km/h; 4.6 mph) submerged
- Test depth: 80 m (260 ft)
- Complement: 44 (4 officers + 40 non-officers and sailors)
- Armament: 6 × 533 mm (21 in) torpedo tubes (4 bow, 2 stern); 1 × 100 mm (4 in) / 47 caliber deck gun; 2 x 1 – 13.2 mm (0.52 in) anti-aircraft guns

Italian submarine Perla was a Perla-class submarine built for the Royal Italian Navy (Regia Marina) during the 1930s. She was named after a gemstone Pearl.

== Design and description ==
The Perla-class submarines were essentially repeats of the preceding Sirena class. The modifications that were made compared to the boats of the previous series were mostly of upgrade nature. Among them were enlargement of the false tower at the top, more modern engines, installation of a radiogoniometer that could be controlled from inside the ship. Improvements and the installation of new air conditioning equipment meant a slight increase in displacement, and increase in the fuel stowage also increased the autonomy of these boats compared to the previous series. Their designed full load displacement was 695 metric tons (684 long tons) surfaced and 855 metric tons (841 long tons) submerged, but varied somewhat depending on the boat and the builder. The submarines were 197 feet 6 inches (60.20 m) long, had a beam of 21 feet (6.4 m) and a draft of 15 feet (4.6 m) to 15 feet 5 inches (4.70 m).

For surface running, the boats were powered by two diesel engines, each driving one propeller shaft with overall power of 675–750 hp (503–559 kW). They could reach 14 knots (26 km/h; 16 mph) on the surface and 7.5 knots (13.9 km/h; 8.6 mph) underwater. On the surface, the Perla class had a range of 5,200 nautical miles (9,600 km; 6,000 mi) at 8 knots (15 km/h; 9.2 mph), submerged, they had a range of 74 nmi (137 km; 85 mi) at 4 knots (7.4 km/h; 4.6 mph).

The boats were armed with six internal 53.3 cm (21.0 in) torpedo tubes, four in the bow and two in the stern. One reload torpedo was carried for each tube, for a total of twelve. They were also armed with one 100 mm (4 in) deck gun for combat on the surface. The light anti-aircraft armament consisted of one or two pairs of 13.2 mm (0.52 in) machine guns.

== Construction and career ==
Perla was built by CRDA at their shipyard in Monfalcone, laid on 31 August 1935, launched on 3 May 1936 and completed on 8 July 1936.

After delivery, Perla was assigned to the 35th Squadron (III Submarine group) based at Messina, though she was operating out of Augusta. In the same year, Perla carried out an extensive training cruise that took her to Tobruk, Benghazi, Bardia, Leros, Rhodes, and other ports in the Dodecanese eventually returning to Augusta. In 1937 she undertook a similar training cruise in the Mediterranean visiting mostly domestic ports returning to Taranto.

In 1938 she was assigned to the Red Sea base of Massawa in Eritrea with the task of testing the submarine performance in warm seas. From 29 December 1938 to 24 January 1939 Perla, together with Glauco, undertook a cruise off the coast of Somalia.

In the spring of 1939 Perla and Gemma performed a cruise in the Indian Ocean to test the performance of the class in terms of sailing and operational capability in warm seas and during the monsoon season. The results were disappointing: it was discovered that stormy sea prevented the use of submarine's armament and made it very difficult even to remain at a periscope depth. There were also reports of malfunctioning air conditioning system, and leaks of chloromethane were reported.

In 1939 she temporarily returned to Italy for repairs and maintenance.

In the summer of 1939 she was involved in testing the effectiveness of a "bubble-free" torpedo system which occurred in Naples. The existing system on Italian submarines released large amounts of air bubbles during torpedo launch, which helped in spotting the torpedoes and the location of the submarine. The tests passed with satisfactory results.

At the time of Italy's entrance into World War II Perla was again in Massawa as part of 82nd Squadron and commanded by captain Mario Pouchain.

According to the initial orders, Perla was supposed to remain in Massawa during the first weeks of the war, but Viceroy Amedeo de Aosta demanded that two additional submarines be deployed in the operations area. Rear Admiral Carlo Balsamo, Massawa Base Commander, agreed to the request and sent out Perla and Archimede. Perla left Massawa on the afternoon of 19 June 1940 to patrol an area in the Gulf of Tadjoura about 15 nautical miles from Ras-El Bir. Perla was supposed to remain at her station until 9 July and attack any enemy ships she came across.

On 20 June an electrician suffered a heat stroke due to the malfunctioning air-conditioning system. The captain ordered inspection and maintenance to be conducted, and the submarine surfaced during the night of 21 June to minimize the risk of poisoning. At dawn, Perla submerged and soon after several crew members fell ill. As time went by, more men became ill, and the ones already suffering started exhibiting signs of chloromethane poisoning, including hallucinations. On 22–23 June Perla patrolled her designated area. On 24 June another submarine returned to Massawa with half of her crew poisoned by chloromethane, and Perla was ordered to return to Massawa immediately to undergo repairs.

Perla turned around during the night of 24 June, but the next day the commander fell sick too, and more than half of the crew was suffering from poisoning. Perla had to go submerged through the Bab-el-Mandeb Strait, and the temperature inside the boat reached 64 °C. On 26 June a sailor died, and more people became sick. Finally at sunset the submarine surfaced and immediately found herself facing the British sloop HMS Shoreham, which immediately charged at her. The submarine was forced to crash dive and stay at the bottom for a few hours while depth charges were launched by the enemy, but sustained minimal damage.

On the evening of 26 June Perla again surfaced and continued her trip back to Massawa; however, during the night, when she was about 20 miles from Sciab Sciach lighthouse, she ran aground. A message was sent to Massawa, requesting help, and the destroyers Leone and Pantera together with torpedo boat Giovanni Acerbi were dispatched. Leone had to turn back due to engine failure, and the other two ships had to face a superior enemy group (light cruiser HMNZS Leander and destroyers HMS Kingston and HMS Kandahar) that were heading towards Perla. Kingston, approaching the submarine, opened fire and Perla replied with her gun, but it jammed on the second shot. Captain Pouchain ordered that the ship be abandoned and that all secret documents and codes be destroyed. Only the timely arrival of two Italian air groups (eight SM-81 bombers) saved Perla as they attacked the enemy ships and forced them to flee.

On 15 July a rescue ship arrived from Massawa, and in five days Perla was hastily repaired to bring her into sailable condition. She was subsequently towed to Massawa on 20 July. As soon as she returned to the base, Perla underwent major repairs and remained nonoperational for a long time.

In January 1941, when it became clear that Italian East Africa would eventually fall, it was decided to send submarines to Bordeaux to try to save them from either destruction or capture by the British. Perla as well as other submarines were modified for the journey: her fuel tanks were enlarged, some torpedoes, gun ammunition were removed as well as some non-critical items.

Perla left Massawa on 1 March 1941 under the command of captain Bruno Napp. Just as she departed she was attacked by a British Bristol Blenheim bomber with depth charges but without any success. Perla traveled submerged through the Red Sea and the Bab-el-Mandeb Strait and only surfaced once she reached the Indian Ocean. She traveled south, passing east of Madagascar, where she rendezvoused with Atlantis and got refueled and restocked. Atlantis' skipper, Bernhard Rogge, wrote in his memoirs that, after seeing the small coastal submarine and its emaciated crew, he told the commander, Lt. Bruno Napp, his perplexity about his mission and suggested to him to reach either Brazil or Argentina to be interned; by his account, Napp politely rejected the advice, telling that he would do his utmost to obey his orders, much to Rogge's admiration. Perla then had to travel 4,000 nm until her next meeting with Northmark. She continued her trip north, passing the Cape Verde Islands, then between the Canary Islands and the Azores, and then into the Bay of Biscay and eventually arrived in Bordeaux on 20 May 1941. Overall, Perla covered 13,100 nm in 81 days of navigation.

After four months of repairs at the base, Perla was back in operation. She sailed from Bordeaux on 20 September 1941 to the Mediterranean through the Strait of Gibraltar and on 3 October 1941 arrived in Cagliari.

Perla made her first patrol in the Mediterranean off Cyrenaica from 12 to 23 February 1942.

The submarine made two similar missions, the first one from 29 March to 9 April 1942, and the second from 16 to 28 April 1942. Both were conducted near Crete, southwest of Gaudo.

On 10 May she was deployed to patrol off Kelibia along the Tunisian coast and on the following day Perla sighted HMS Welshman east of the island of La Galite and launched two torpedoes at the target, but they both missed. She returned to the base on 24 May.

On 6 July 1942 Perla under command of captain Gioacchino Ventura, sailed to the area of her operation off Cyprus. In the afternoon of 9 July she sighted and launched two torpedoes at the British corvette HMS Hyacinth off Beirut, but they both missed. Hyacinth counterattacked with depth charges that eventually caused serious damage to the submarine, forcing her to surface.

The captain ordered the crew to abandon the submarine and open the Kingston valves. Due to damage sustained by the submarine, some of the valves could not be opened, and the submarine was sinking very slowly. A boarding party from Hyacinth boarded Perla, closed the valves and then towed her to Beirut.

Captured Perla in Beruit, Syria, 17 July 1942 with an armed British sentry guarding it.

The whole crew, except officer Antonio De Maria, who died in the clash, was rescued and then captured by the British.

== Allied service ==
Perla was renamed P-712 and used by the Royal Navy to assess the level of development of Italian submarines. In 1943 she was transferred to the Hellenic Navy, who renamed her Matrozos with a pennant number of Υ-7. She served with the Hellenic Navy until 1947, when she was struck and later scrapped.
