= Perla-class submarine =

Submarine class of the Royal Italian Navy

- Perla-class submarine (Perla)

Class overview
- Name: Perla class
- Builders: OTO, Muggiano; CRDA, Monfalcone
- Operators: Regia Marina
- Preceded by: Sirena class
- Succeeded by: Adua class
- Built: 1935–36
- In commission: 1936–1947
- Completed: 10
- Lost: 6
- Scrapped: 4

General characteristics
- Type: Coastal submarine
- Displacement: 695 tonnes (684 long tons) surfaced; 855 tonnes (841 long tons) submerged
- Length: 197 ft 6 in (60.20 m)
- Beam: 21 ft (6.4 m)
- Draft: 15 ft 5 in (4.70 m)
- Installed power: 1,400 hp (1,000 kW) (diesels); 800 hp (600 kW) (electric motors)
- Propulsion: Diesel-electric; 2 × diesel engines; 2 × electric motors
- Speed: 14 knots (26 km/h; 16 mph) surfaced; 7.5 knots (13.9 km/h; 8.6 mph) submerged
- Range: 5,200 nmi (9,600 km; 6,000 mi) at 8 knots (15 km/h; 9.2 mph) surfaced; 74 nmi (137 km; 85 mi) at 4 knots (7.4 km/h; 4.6 mph) submerged
- Test depth: 80 m (260 ft)
- Complement: 45
- Armament: 6 × 533 mm (21 in) torpedo tubes (4 bow, 2 stern); 1 × 100 mm (4 in) / 47 caliber deck gun; 1 or 2 × twin 13.2 mm (0.52 in) anti-aircraft guns

The Perla-class submarines were the third sub-class of the 600 Series of coastal submarines built for the Royal Italian Navy (Regia Marina) during the 1930s and named after gemstones. Of the ten boats built of this class, only three survived World War II.

== Design and description ==
The Perla-class submarines were essentially repeats of the preceding Sirena class. The modifications that were made compared to the boats of the previous series were mostly of upgrade nature. Among them were enlargement of the false tower at the top, more modern engines, installation of a radiogoniometer that could be controlled from inside the ship. Improvements and the installation of new air conditioning equipment meant a slight increase in displacement, and increase in the fuel stowage also increased the autonomy of these boats compared to the previous series. Their designed full load displacement was 695 metric tons (684 long tons) surfaced and 855 metric tons (841 long tons) submerged, but varied somewhat depending on the boat and the builder. The submarines were 197 feet 6 inches (60.20 m) long, had a beam of 21 feet (6.4 m) and a draft of 15 feet (4.6 m) to 15 feet 5 inches (4.70 m).

For surface running, the boats were powered by two diesel engines, each driving one propeller shaft with overall power of 675–750 hp (503–559 kW). When submerged each propeller was driven by a 400-horsepower (298 kW) electric motor. They could reach 14 knots (26 km/h; 16 mph) on the surface and 7.5 knots (13.9 km/h; 8.6 mph) underwater. On the surface, the Perla class had a range of 5,200 nautical miles (9,600 km; 6,000 mi) at 8 knots (15 km/h; 9.2 mph), submerged, they had a range of 74 nmi (137 km; 85 mi) at 4 knots (7.4 km/h; 4.6 mph).

The boats were armed with six internal 53.3 cm (21.0 in) torpedo tubes, four in the bow and two in the stern. One reload torpedo was carried for each tube, for a total of twelve. They were also armed with one 100 mm (4 in) deck gun for combat on the surface. The light anti-aircraft armament consisted of one or two pairs of 13.2 mm (0.52 in) machine guns.

== Ships ==
Construction data
Ship	Builder	Launched	Date of loss	Fate
Ambra	OTO	28 May 1936	4 September 1944	Sunk in Genoa by Allied aircraft
Berillo	CRDA	14 June 1936	2 October 1940	Sunk by HMS Havock and HMS Hasty about 120 miles north of Sidi Barrani
Corallo	CRDA	2 August 1936	13 December 1942	Sunk by HMS Enchantress
Diaspro	CRDA	5 July 1936	1 February 1948	Sank a British-flagged steamer off Valencia during the Spanish Civil War. Struck
Gemma	CRDA	21 May 1936	8 October 1940	Sunk in error by Italian submarine Tricheco
Iride	OTO	30 July 1936	22 August 1940	Sunk in Gulf of Bomba by Swordfish aircraft from HMS Eagle
Malachite	OTO	15 July 1936	9 February 1943	Sunk by Dutch submarine HNMS Dolfijn
Onice	OTO	15 June 1936	1 February 1948	Struck
Perla	CRDA	3 May 1936	9 July 1942	Captured by the British, transferred to Greek service as Matrozos. Broken up, 1954
Turchese	CRDA	19 July 1936	1 February 1948	Struck

An armed British sentry guarding the captured Axis submarine Perla in Beirut Syria, 17 July 1942

== Service ==
The boats, once commissioned, were assigned to complete the squadrons of "600" submarines from La Spezia (12th and 13th Squadrons) and Messina (34th and 35th Squadrons) and began their training and exercises in metropolitan waters, and underwent endurance training predominantly in the Dodecanese and, to a lesser extent, along the coast of North Africa. These endurance exercises took place in 1936 and 1937, soon after the initial training was finished.

Iride and Onice were "lent" to the Nationalist side during the Spanish Civil War, under the names of Gonzales Lopez and Aguilar Tablada respectively, in the framework of Italy's aid to Franco's regime. They retained their Italian crews but had a Spanish liaison officer on board. They were returned to the Italian Navy at the end of the conflict.

In 1938 Perla and Gemma were sent to the Red Sea base of Massawa and returned the following year replaced by Onice, Berillo and Iride who in turn returned to Italy before the outbreak of World War II. Between 1938 and 1940 Ambra and Malachite were for long periods of time deployed outside of Italy, mainly in Tobruk.

At the outbreak of hostilities, four boats were located at La Spezia, three in Cagliari, two in Augusta and one, Perla, in Massawa.

After a disastrous start to the World War II when Italy lost ten submarines in the first twenty days, and the Regia Marina and Regia Aeronautica did not fare much better, Italian command decided to speed up implementation of experimental SLC technology. In July 1940 Iride was modified to carry 4 "Maiale" manned torpedoes in watertight containers on the deck of the submarines. Iride was sunk while conducting tests, before she could be employed against British naval units. Ambra underwent conversion to SLC in March 1942 with three SLC units being fitted onto her deck. With a weight of 2.8 tons, these SLC cylinders were able to withstand depths up to 90 meters, about three times more than those installed on Iride. In December 1942, Ambra managed to penetrate Algiers harbor, and sank or seriously damaged several merchant ships with a total GRT over 20,000.

In common with other Italian submarines the survivors were fitted with smaller conning towers in 1942–43.

Overall, the Perla class submarines proved to be quite successful. They showed good maneuverability, their hull was well designed and strongly built to withstand depth pressure and explosions that exceeded their test values.

== See also ==
- Italian submarines of World War II
