= Italian submarine Gemma =

Italian submarine

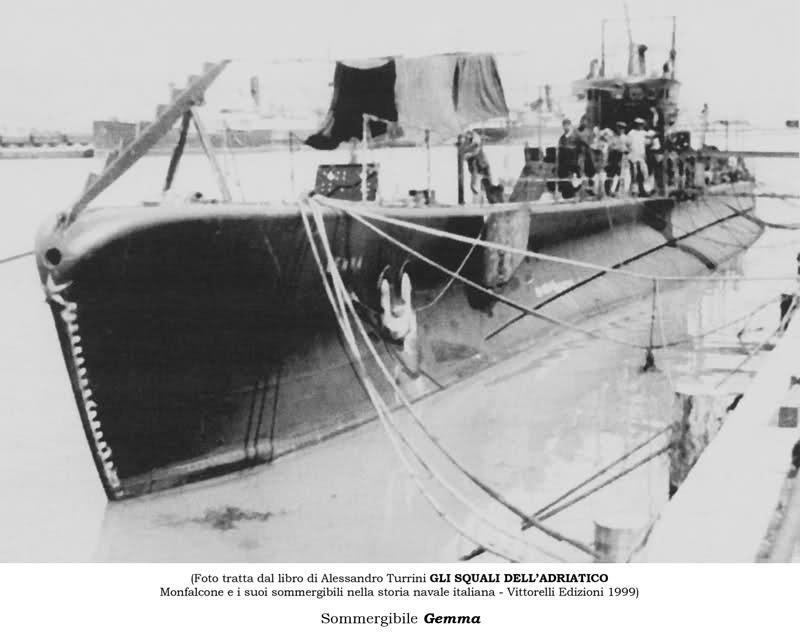
- RIN Gemma

History

Kingdom of Italy
- Name: Gemma
- Namesake: Gemstone
- Builder: CRDA, Monfalcone
- Laid down: 7 September 1935
- Launched: 21 May 1936
- Commissioned: 8 July 1936
- Fate: Sunk, 8 October 1940

General characteristics
- Class & type: Perla-class submarine
- Displacement: 626.115 tonnes (616 long tons) standard; 700.54 tonnes (689 long tons) normal (surfaced); 859.69 tonnes (846 long tons) normal (submerged)
- Length: 60.18 m (197 ft 5 in)
- Beam: 6.454 m (21 ft 2.1 in)
- Draft: 4.709 m (15 ft 5.4 in)
- Installed power: 1,500 hp (1,100 kW) (diesels); 800 hp (600 kW) (electric motors)
- Propulsion: Diesel-electric; 2 × FIAT diesel engines; 2 × CRDA electric engines
- Speed: 14 knots (26 km/h; 16 mph) surfaced; 7.5 knots (13.9 km/h; 8.6 mph) submerged
- Range: 5,200 nmi (9,600 km; 6,000 mi) at 8 knots (15 km/h; 9.2 mph) surfaced; 74 nmi (137 km; 85 mi) at 4 knots (7.4 km/h; 4.6 mph) submerged
- Test depth: 80 m (260 ft)
- Complement: 44 (4 officers + 40 non-officers and sailors)
- Armament: 6 × 533 mm (21 in) torpedo tubes (4 bow, 2 stern); 1 × 100 mm (4 in) / 47 caliber deck gun; 2 x 1 – 13.2 mm (0.52 in) anti-aircraft guns

Italian submarine Gemma was a Perla-class submarine built for the Royal Italian Navy (Regia Marina) during the 1930s. Her name in Italian means a gemstone or jewel.

== Design and description ==
The Perla-class submarines were essentially repeats of the preceding Sirena class. The modifications that were made compared to the boats of the previous series were mostly of upgrade nature. Among them were enlargement of the false tower at the top, more modern engines, installation of a radiogoniometer that could be controlled from inside the ship. Improvements and the installation of new air conditioning equipment meant a slight increase in displacement, and increase in the fuel stowage also increased the autonomy of these boats compared to the previous series. Their designed full load displacement was 695 metric tons (684 long tons) surfaced and 855 metric tons (841 long tons) submerged, but varied somewhat depending on the boat and the builder. The submarines were 197 feet 6 inches (60.20 m) long, had a beam of 21 feet (6.4 m) and a draft of 15 feet (4.6 m) to 15 feet 5 inches (4.70 m).

For surface running, the boats were powered by two diesel engines, each driving one propeller shaft with overall power of 675–750 hp (503–559 kW). When submerged each propeller was driven by a 400-horsepower (298 kW) electric motor. They could reach 14 knots (26 km/h; 16 mph) on the surface and 7.5 knots (13.9 km/h; 8.6 mph) underwater. On the surface, the Perla class had a range of 5,200 nautical miles (9,600 km; 6,000 mi) at 8 knots (15 km/h; 9.2 mph), submerged, they had a range of 74 nmi (137 km; 85 mi) at 4 knots (7.4 km/h; 4.6 mph).

The boats were armed with six internal 53.3 cm (21.0 in) torpedo tubes, four in the bow and two in the stern. One reload torpedo was carried for each tube, for a total of twelve. They were also armed with one 100 mm (4 in) deck gun for combat on the surface. The light anti-aircraft armament consisted of one or two pairs of 13.2 mm (0.52 in) machine guns.

== Construction and career ==
Gemma was built by CRDA at their shipyard in Monfalcone, laid on 7 September 1935, launched on 21 May 1936 and completed on 8 July 1936.

After delivery, Gemma was assigned to the 35th Squadron (III Submarine group) based at Messina. After a brief training, she carried out a long endurance cruise in the Dodecanese in the fall of 1936. She repeated the same endurance cruise in the Dodecanese in 1937.

From August 27 through September 5, 1937 Gemma, under command of captain Carlo Ferracuti, carried out a secret mission in the Strait of Sicily during the Spanish Civil War. She made three attempts to attack during this mission, but no actual attacks happened due to impossibility to identify the targets with certainty. Upon completion she returned to Augusta.

In 1938, Gemma together with Perla were assigned to the Red Sea base of Massawa in Eritrea. In the spring of 1939 Gemma and Perla performed a cruise in the Indian Ocean to test the performance of the class in terms of sailing and operational capability in warm seas and during the monsoon season. The results were disappointing: it was discovered that stormy sea prevented the use of submarine's armament and made it very difficult even to remain at a periscope depth. There were also reports of malfunctioning air conditioning system, and leaks of chloromethane were reported. In the fall of 1939 she came back to the Mediterranean and was assigned to the 14th Submarine Squadron (I Submarine group) based at La Spezia. In 1940 Gemma was reassigned to the 13th Submarine Squadron (I Submarine Group), but was operating from Leros.

After Italy's entrance into World War II, Gemma, under command of Guido Lanza Cordero di Montezemolo, was sent to patrol off Chios. She returned to her base on June 15 without encountering any traffic.

From June 30 through July 8, 1940 Gemma patrolled off Sollum, and returned to her base without sighting any enemy ships.

From August 7 through August 16, 1940 she patrolled off Crete, but again without any success.

On September 30, 1940, Gemma sailed to her area of operation, located in the northern section of the Strait of Kasos, just east of Crete. Amethyst was deployed to the south of Gemma, in the center of the Strait of Kasos, and further south, another submarine, Tricheco under command of captain Alberto Avogadro di Cerrione, was deployed. Gemma arrived in the area on October 1 and was supposed to remain on station until October 8, but in the evening of October 3 she was ordered to patrol further east in the strait between Rhodes and Karpathos. On October 6, a new order was sent to Gemma telling her to return to the base, but due to a mix-up the message was never received by Gemma and she remained on her station. On October 7, Tricheco had a sick crew on board and had to return to Leros. On her return voyage she had to pass near the eastern coast of Karpathos, thus crossing an area where Gemma was stationed. Due to a mix-up and delay in communication, Tricheco was unaware of Gemma's location.

At 1:15 on Oct. 8, Tricheco sighted in the dark a silhouette of a submarine on the surface. Since it was impossible to recognize the nationality of a submarine at night, it was a normal practice to consider all unknown submarines enemies, unless a presence of a submarine was communicated to the captain. At 1:21 Tricheco launched two torpedoes from a short distance against an "enemy" ship. Gemma was hit by both torpedoes right in the middle and immediately sank with the entire crew in the position 35°30′N 27°18′E just off the coast of Karpathos. Captain Cordero di Montezemolo, four other officers, and 39 other crew members went down with the boat.

Initially the disappearance of Gemma was attributed to British anti-submarine activity, as the October 8th radio news reported the loss of two enemy submarines with several survivors captured which gave families some hope. However, soon the coincidence between Tricheco's attack and the disappearance of Gemma became all too obvious. Gemma was declared as lost, and her crew was declared dead, rather than missing.
