= Italian submarine Guglielmotti (1938) =

Italian submarine

History

Kingdom of Italy
- Name: Guglielmotti
- Namesake: Alberto Guglielmotti
- Builder: Tosi, Taranto
- Laid down: 3 December 1936
- Launched: 11 September 1938
- Commissioned: 12 October 1938
- Motto: Nella difesa degli oppressi e nella punizione degli scellerati (Defending the oppressed and punishing the evil)
- Fate: Sunk, 17 March 1942

General characteristics
- Class & type: Brin-class submarine
- Displacement: 1,016.92 tonnes (1,001 long tons) surfaced; 1,265.77 tonnes (1,246 long tons) submerged
- Length: 72.50 m (237 ft 10 in)
- Beam: 6.80 m (22 ft 4 in)
- Draft: 4.20 m (13 ft 9 in)
- Installed power: 3,400 hp (2,500 kW) (diesels); 1,300 hp (970 kW) (electric motors)
- Propulsion: Diesel-electric; 2 × Tosi diesel engines; 2 × Ansaldo electric motors
- Speed: 17.37 knots (32.17 km/h; 19.99 mph) surfaced; 8.62 knots (15.96 km/h; 9.92 mph) submerged
- Range: 9,753 nmi (18,063 km; 11,224 mi) at 8 knots (15 km/h; 9.2 mph) surfaced; 90 nmi (170 km; 100 mi) at 4 knots (7.4 km/h; 4.6 mph) submerged
- Test depth: 100 m (330 ft)
- Complement: 54 (7 officers + 47 non-officers and sailors)
- Armament: 8 × 533 mm (21 in) torpedo tubes (4 bow, 4 stern); 1 × 100 mm (4 in) deck gun; 2 × twin 13.2 mm (0.52 in) anti-aircraft guns

Guglielmotti was a Brin-class submarine built for the Royal Italian Navy (Regia Marina) during the 1930s.

== Design and description ==
The Brin-class submarines were improved versions of the preceding Archimede class. They displaced 1,000 metric tons (980 long tons) surfaced and 1,254 metric tons (1,234 long tons) submerged. The submarines were 72.47 meters (237 ft 9 in) long, had a beam of 6.68 meters (21 ft 11 in) and a draft of 4.54 meters (14 ft 11 in). The class was partially double hulled.

For surface running, the boats were powered by two 1,500-brake-horsepower (1,119 kW) diesel engines, each driving one propeller shaft. When submerged each propeller was driven by a 550-horsepower (410 kW) electric motor. They could reach 17.3 knots (32.0 km/h; 19.9 mph) on the surface and 7.8 knots (14.4 km/h; 9.0 mph) underwater. On the surface, the Brin class had a range of 9,000 nautical miles (17,000 km; 10,000 mi) at 8 knots (15 km/h; 9.2 mph), submerged, they had a range of 90 nmi (170 km; 100 mi) at 4 knots (7.4 km/h; 4.6 mph).

The boats were armed with eight internal 53.3 cm (21.0 in) torpedo tubes, four each in the bow and stern. They carried a total of 14 torpedoes. They were also armed with one 100 mm (4 in) deck gun for combat on the surface. The gun was initially mounted in the rear of the conning tower, but this was re-sited on the forward deck later in the war in the surviving boats and the large conning tower was re-built to a smaller design. The light anti-aircraft armament consisted of one or two pairs of 13.2 mm (0.52 in) machine guns.

== Construction and career ==
Guglielmotti was built by Tosi shipyard in Taranto, laid down on 3 December 1936, and launched on 11 September 1938. She was named after Father Alberto Guglielmotti, a renowned Italian theologian, historian and a scholar of the history of the Italian Navy.

Upon her commission, Guglielmotti was assigned together with Brin, Archimede, Torricelli and Galvani, as well as the older Galileo Galilei and Galileo Ferraris to the 44th Squadron based at Taranto. During 1939 Galileo Galilei and Galileo Ferraris were moved to a different location and the 44th Squadron was renamed to 41st Squadron.

During June 21–29, 1939 she undertook a training cruise from Naples to Lisbon, under the command of captain Folco Bonamici. Her task was to investigate conditions at the Strait of Gibraltar, and experiment with the transfer to the Atlantic and to optimize navigation time and performance. She started her return trip on July 3, and came back to Naples on 8 July 1939. In the following months, she underwent extensive training and performed exercises.

In 1940 Guglielmotti was reassigned to the 81st Squadron (VIII Submarine Group) based at the Red Sea port of Massawa. Her commander at the time was captain Carlo Tucci.

Her first war mission was to retrieve the men of Macallé who ended up stranded on the deserted island of Barr Musa Chebir after their submarine ran aground and was scuttled. Guglielmotti left Massawa on June 21, 1940, and picked up all 21 men next day at 12:45 and then returned to Massawa.

On July 26, 1940, she was sent together with destroyers Cesare Battisti and Francesco Nullo to search for two Greek merchants or a British merchant according to other sources, that had been reported as coming from Suez and heading south but the ship had never been found. She returned to Massawa on July 31.

During 21–25 August 1940 she performed another mission in the Red Sea without sighting any vessels.

On September 6, 1940 Guglielmotti while on patrol, searching for the British convoy BN-4 south of the Farasan Islands, at about 15:00 sighted two ships. One was too far away, but the other was close and in a good position for an attack. This was a 30 year old tanker Atlas (4008 GRT) sailing under the Greek flag from Abadan to Suez, straggling behind the convoy BN-4. Guglielmotti closed in to within 700 meters and launched two torpedoes. The tanker was hit by both on starboard side opening a large hole from which the oil started flowing into the sea. The crew abandoned the ship, and rowed towards Aden. Since the tanker did not appear to be sinking, captain Tucci ordered to launch another torpedo, which missed the ship. The fourth torpedo was then launched which hit the ship and broke her into two. Atlas sank in the position 15°50′N 41°50′E.

On September 20, 1940 Guglielmotti and Archimede were sent to intercept British convoy BN-5, but they could not locate it.

On October 20–21, 1940 Guglielmotti and 'Galileo Ferraris' were sent to intercept British convoy BN-7 consisting of 31 merchants escorted by light cruiser HMNZS Leander, destroyer HMS Kimberley and 5 sloops. Despite all the efforts, the submarines could not locate the convoy.

In January 1941, when it became clear that Italian East Africa would eventually fall, it was decided to send submarines to Bordeaux to try to save them from either destruction or capture by the British. All submarines were modified for the journey: their fuel tanks were enlarged, some torpedoes, gun ammunition were removed as well as some non-critical items.

On March 3–4, 1941 Guglielmotti under command of Commander Gino Spagone left Massawa together with Archimede and headed to Bordeaux, in the occupied part of France. After circumnavigating Africa, and being refueled and restocked by the German tanker Northmark on her way, she finally arrived at Bordeaux on May 6, 1941. Archimede arrived at Bordeaux on 7 May 1941. Overall, Guglielmotti traveled 12,425 nautical miles (23,011 km; 14,298 mi) in 66 days to conclude another war patrol. Upon her arrival, Guglielmotti underwent maintenance and repairs which kept her out of operation until September 1941.

On September 22, 1941, she sailed from Bordeaux to return to the Mediterranean. On September 30, 1941 Guglielmotti traveled through the Strait of Gibraltar, and on October 16, 1941, she arrived in Messina without any incidents.

From November 1941 through February 1942 she was at the Arsenal of Taranto undergoing maintenance and upgrades. As part of the procedure, her 100/43 mm Mod. 1927 gun was replaced with a more modern 100 mm (4 in)/47 caliber piece.

After the work was finished, on March 15, 1942, Guglielmotti under command of Lieutenant Federico Tamburini departed from Taranto to her new base in Cagliari. At 6:33 on March 17 the British submarine HMS Unbeaten, patrolling off Capo dell'Armi, detected her over the hydrophones and two minutes later sighted Guglielmotti 2200 yards away. After maneuvering to assume a better firing position, at 6:40 HMS Unbeaten launched four torpedoes. After a minute and 40 seconds an explosion was heard, and Guglielmotti sank quickly in the position 37°42′N 15°58′E, about 15 miles south of Cape Spartivento taking the majority of the crew down with her.

At 7:20 HMS Unbeaten surfaced, observed there were a dozen survivors in the water, and approached to pick them up. However, a plane was sighted, and the submarine crash dove to avoid being detected and left the area. In about three hours a torpedo boat Francesco Stocco arrived, and launched a depth-charge attack at the place of sinking, but the British submarine was already far away. Of the twelve survivors seen in the water by Unbeaten, Francesco Stocco found and recovered only a corpse. There were no survivors among the 61 men of the crew.

Ships sunk by Guglielmotti
Date	Ship	Flag	Tonnage	Ship Type	Cargo
6 September 1940	Atlas	(Greece)	4,008 GRT	tanker	Oil
Total:			4,008 GRT		
