= Italian submarine Guglielmotti =

Guglielmotti was the name of at least two ships of the Italian Navy and may refer to:

- Italian submarine Guglielmotti (1916), a Pacinotti-class submarine launched in 1916 and sunk in 1917.
- Italian submarine Guglielmotti (1938), a Brin-class submarine launched in 1938 and sunk in 1942.
