= USS Scott (DE-214) =

Buckley-class destroyer escort

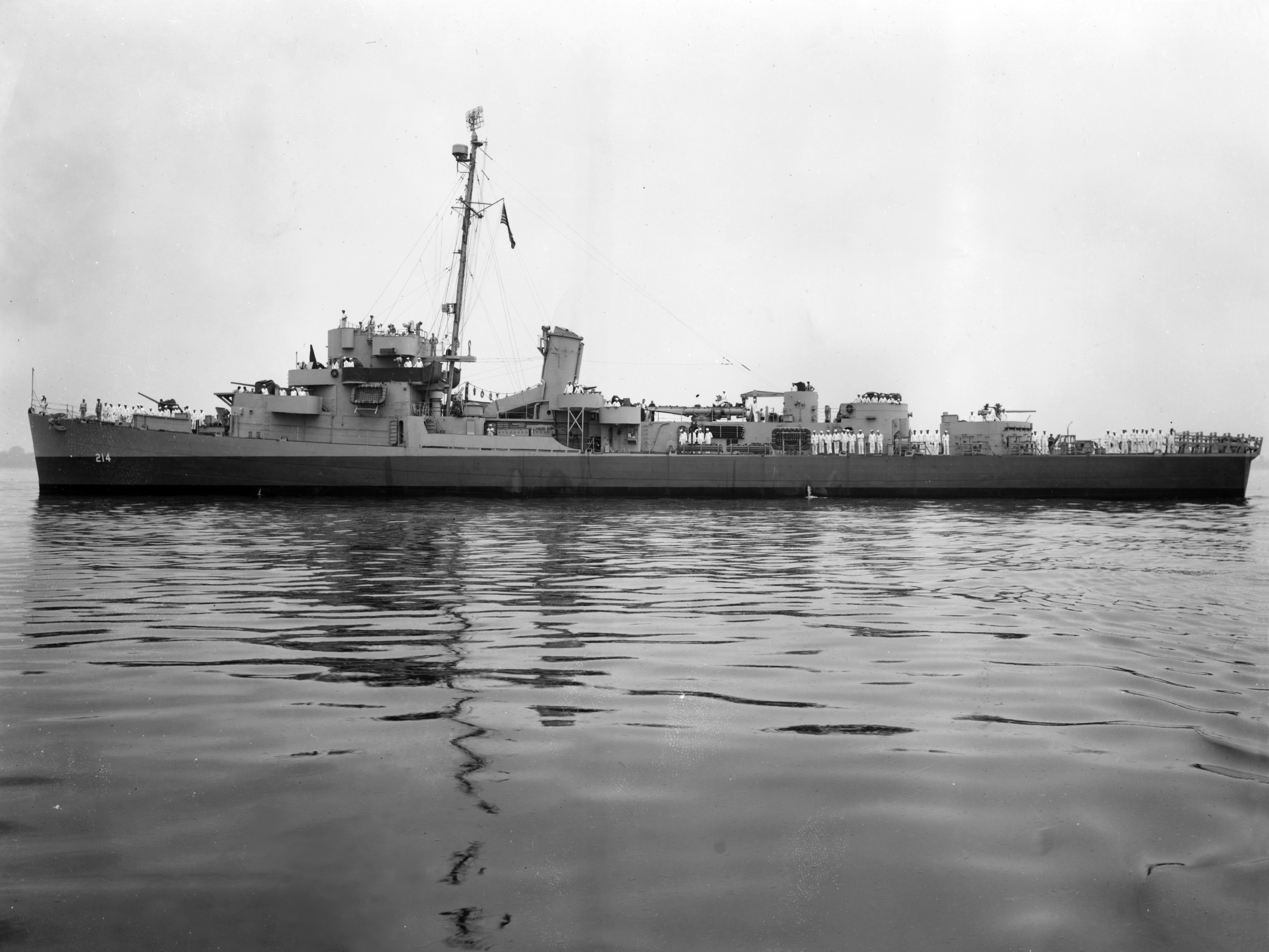

History

United States
- Name: USS Scott
- Namesake: Robert R. Scott
- Ordered: 1942
- Builder: Philadelphia Navy Yard, Philadelphia
- Laid down: 1 January 1943
- Launched: 3 April 1943
- Commissioned: 20 July 1943
- Decommissioned: 3 March 1947
- Stricken: 1 July 1965
- Fate: Sold for scrap, 20 January 1967

General characteristics
- Class & type: Buckley-class destroyer escort
- Displacement: 1,400 long tons (1,422 t) light; 1,740 long tons (1,768 t) standard
- Length: 306 ft (93 m)
- Beam: 37 ft (11 m)
- Draft: 9 ft 6 in (2.90 m) standard; 11 ft 3 in (3.43 m) full load
- Propulsion: 2 × boilers; General Electric turbo-electric drive; 12,000 shp (8.9 MW); 2 × solid manganese-bronze 3,600 lb (1,600 kg) 3-bladed propellers, 8 ft 6 in (2.59 m) diameter, 7 ft 7 in (2.31 m) pitch; 2 × rudders; 359 tons fuel oil
- Speed: 23 knots (43 km/h; 26 mph)
- Range: 3,700 nmi (6,900 km) at 15 kn (28 km/h; 17 mph); 6,000 nmi (11,000 km) at 12 kn (22 km/h; 14 mph)
- Complement: 15 officers, 198 men
- Armament: 3 × 3-inch/50-caliber guns; 1 × quad 1.1-inch/75-caliber gun; 8 × single 20 mm guns; 1 × triple 21 inch (533 mm) torpedo tubes; 1 × Hedgehog anti-submarine mortar; 8 × K-gun depth charge projectors; 2 × depth charge tracks

USS Scott (DE-214), was a Buckley-class destroyer escort in service with the United States Navy from 1943 to 1947. She was scrapped in 1967.

== History ==
Scott was named in honor of Machinist's Mate First Class Robert R. Scott (1915–1941, who was killed in action during the Japanese attack on Pearl Harbor on 7 December 1941, while serving aboard the battleship USS California. He was posthumously awarded the Medal of Honor for his heroism.

Scott was laid down on 1 January 1943 by the Philadelphia Navy Yard; launched on 3 April 1943; sponsored by Mrs. George McBride; and commissioned on 20 July 1943. Mrs. McBride, born in Convoy, Co. Donegal, Ireland, had five sons serving in the Navy - Gene, Bill, Emmett, Terry, and Francis.

After shakedown at Bermuda and post-shakedown repairs at Philadelphia, Scott rendezvoused with her first convoy off Bermuda on 23 September 1943 and escorted it to Curaçao. After escorting convoys to New York City and back, Scott departed Curaçao on 29 October for her first transatlantic convoy voyage to Derry, Northern Ireland. She served on the Derry-New York convoy route until 4 October 1944, crossing the ocean a total of 16 times without incident. Between voyages, she underwent anti-submarine training at Derry or Casco Bay, Maine, and received voyage repairs made necessary by the rough North Atlantic weather. As flagship of Escort Division 17, Scott was usually escort commander for her convoys.

On 1 November 1944, Scott left Norfolk, Virginia with a slow convoy for the Mediterranean, but was detached on 15 November to assist USS Frament which had been damaged in a collision with the Luigi Settembrini, off the Azores. She helped search for Italian survivors, and then escorted Frament back to Boston, arriving on 3 December.

Between 14 December 1944 and 16 January 1945, Scott provided training services for submarines in New London, Connecticut. On the 16th, she departed New London escorting the Le Centaure to Casablanca. After repairs at Bermuda and the Azores, the submarine was safely delivered at Casablanca on 23 February. Scott then escorted two Army dredges from the Azores to Delaware Bay, arriving on 30 March.

Scott next served under the Atlantic Training Command, first at Norfolk and then at Mayport, escorting ships undergoing training and investigating reported submarine contacts. On 18 May, she arrived at Key West for experimental duty with the Naval Research Laboratories, Radar Division, and conducted tests of special equipment until 18 July. She underwent overhaul at New York between 20 July and 18 August, and then refresher training at Guantanamo from 21 August to 3 September. The escort was to have been converted to high speed transport APD-64, but due to the end of the war, the much-delayed conversion was cancelled on 10 September 1945.

Scott spent most of the next two months at Casco Bay, Maine, except for four days at Charleston, South Carolina in early October and Navy Day at Newburgh, New York, at the end of the month. The escort arrived at Green Cove Springs, Florida, on 21 November 1945 for inactivation and was decommissioned there on 3 March 1947 and placed in reserve. Scott was struck from the Navy List on 1 July 1965 and was sold on 20 January 1967 to Southern Scrap Metals Company, New Orleans, for scrapping.
