= Ciudad de Barcelona (1929 ship) =

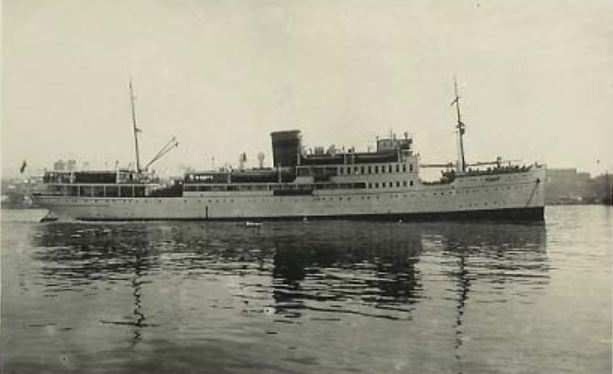
- Ciudad de Barcelona in Mallorca

History
- Name: Infante Don Jaime (1929–1931); Ciudad De Barcelona (1931–1937)
- Owner: Compañía Trasmediterranea (1929–1937)
- Port of registry: (Restoration (Spain)) Kingdom of Spain (1929–1931); (Second Spanish Republic) Spanish Republic (1931–1937)
- Builder: Cantiere Navale Triestino
- Laid down: 15 October 1928
- Launched: 8 June 1929
- Acquired: 30 August 1929
- Identification: Call sign: EARF
- Fate: Sank, 30 May 1937

General characteristics
- Type: Ocean liner
- Tonnage: 3,946 GRT
- Length: 101.2 m (332 ft)
- Beam: 14.9 m (49 ft)
- Depth: 7.9 m (26 ft)
- Propulsion: 2×8-cylinder Burmeister & Wain diesel engines
- Speed: 17.3 knots (32.0 km/h)
- Capacity: 264
- Crew: 62

Ciudad De Barcelona was an ocean liner that was torpedoed and sunk on 30 May 1937, with the loss of more than 200 people. She was built by Cantiere Navale Triestino, Monfalcone, Italy for the Compañía Trasmediterranea and launched on 8 June 1929. Her original name was Infante Don Jaime, but after the declaration of the Second Spanish Republic in April 1931, the ship was renamed Ciudad De Barcelona.

The ship was owned by a company of the Spanish businessman Juan March Ordinas who was an important Falangist’s financial supporter. As the Spanish Civil War broke out in June 1936, Ciudad De Barcelona was requisitioned by the Republican government. She was torpedoed by the Spanish Nationalist Archimede-class submarine General Sanjurjo and sunk off the coast of Malgrat de Mar on 30 May 1937. Ciudad De Barcelona was carrying 200–250 volunteers of the International Brigades from Marseille to Spain. Up to 65 of them are estimated to have drowned, as well as more than 100 other passengers and crew members.

== Service history ==
In 1929–1931, Ciudad de Barcelona offered cruises from Barcelona. From 1931–1936, she sailed between the Balearic and Canary Islands with stops in Cádiz, Santa Cruz de La Palma, Santa Cruz de Tenerife and Las Palmas. Since the beginning of the Spanish Civil War in July 1936, the ship was used to land troops at Ibiza and in the failed Invasion of Mallorca. In October 1936, Ciudad De Barcelona sailed to the Soviet Black Sea ports and made voyages to Marseille and Algiers to transport International Brigade volunteers to Spain.

== Sinking ==
The first effort to sink the Ciudad de Barcelona had been attempted in January 1937, but the torpedo had malfunctioned. On Saturday 29 May 1937, some 200–250 international volunteers boarded the ship in Marseille. They were mainly from the United States, Great Britain, Germany and Italy, but some came from Scandinavia, Australia and New Zealand. There was also a group of French pilots and Senegalese passengers. Ciudad de Barcelona was intended to sail to Barcelona or Valencia, depending on situation of the armed conflict between the communists and anarchists in Barcelona. The ship had a cargo of war material, including items like tanks, tires, motorcycles, cotton fabrics and canned food. A day before, the ship's cargo of flour was sabotaged as someone had poured kerosene upon it. She was under the command of captain Francisco Nadal.

At sunset, Ciudad de Barcelona headed for the open sea with all lights off. She sailed a distance of approximately 1 km (one mile) from the shore, trying to avoid the Italian submarines and warships. The Non-Intervention Committee had ordered this part of the sea under the control of Italian Navy. As the ship reached the Spanish waters, it was warned of the lurking submarines by the Republican airplanes and patrol boats. Soon she was escorted by a Spanish gunship.

On the afternoon of Sunday 30 May, Ciudad de Barcelona was off the coast of Malgrat, about 60 kilometres north of Barcelona. She was spotted by the Italian submarine General Sanjuro, which was under the command of captain Pablo Suances Jaudenes. The submarine was originally named Archimede and transferred to the Spanish nationalist navy in April 1937. General Sanjuro was seeking revenge for the Germans, as the heavy cruiser Deutschland was hit by the Republican airplanes in the port of Ibiza a week earlier. The attack killed 31 German sailors. The submarine launched two torpedoes. The first one missed and landed to the beach of Lloret de Mar. Captain Nadal tried a desperate maneuver by turning Ciudad de Barcelona towards Malgrat, in order to save the passengers, but at 6 PM she was hit by another torpedo which exploded in the engine room. At the time, the ship was only 400 metres off the shore. Ciudad de Barcelona sank rapidly, in just two or three minutes.

The passengers were saved by Republican Coast Guard boats and seaplanes, as well as the local fishermen who rushed to the scene. The President of Catalonia, Lluis Companys, came from Barcelona to observe the lifesaving efforts. The victims were hospitalized, some to the town of Calella and others to Barcelona. The surviving volunteers were transported to Barcelona were they soon joined the International Brigades. Only one decided to leave back home. One of the survivors was the Finnish American newspaperman Hjalmar Sankari (died March 1938 in the Aragon Retreats), an editor of the New York daily Eteenpäin, who wrote an article to his newspaper of the incident. According to Sankari, some of the volunteers were singing the Internationale while they were drowning with the ship.

The death toll was over two hundred dead, although some sources cite more than three hundred. According to the Madrid newspaper ABC, the ship carried 312 passengers and 64 crew members of which 4 died. 60–65 volunteers lost their lives, but only 25 names are known. Among the victims was a group of volunteer military pilots. The Republican government tried to censor news of the incident to avoid a negative effect on future shipments. However, an Italian news agency informed the press of the sinking, and it was already on Monday newspapers.

The wreck of Ciudad de Barcelona lies in the depth of 30 meters and is often visited by divers.
