= Italian submarine Archimede (1939) =

Italian submarine

History

Kingdom of Italy
- Name: Archimede
- Namesake: Archimedes
- Builder: Tosi, Taranto
- Laid down: 23 December 1937
- Launched: 5 March 1939
- Commissioned: 18 April 1939
- Fate: Sunk, 15 April 1943

General characteristics
- Class & type: Brin-class submarine
- Displacement: 1,110.14 tonnes (1,093 long tons) surfaced; 1,402.53 tonnes (1,380 long tons) submerged
- Length: 76.22 m (250 ft 1 in)
- Beam: 6.72 m (22 ft 1 in)
- Draft: 4.30 m (14 ft 1 in)
- Installed power: 3,400 hp (2,500 kW) (diesels); 1,300 hp (970 kW) (electric motors)
- Propulsion: Diesel-electric; 2 × Tosi diesel engines; 2 × Ansaldo electric motors
- Speed: 17.47 knots (32.35 km/h; 20.10 mph) surfaced; 8.62 knots (15.96 km/h; 9.92 mph) submerged
- Range: 11,503 nmi (21,304 km; 13,237 mi) at 8 knots (15 km/h; 9.2 mph) surfaced; 120 nmi (220 km; 140 mi) at 4 knots (7.4 km/h; 4.6 mph) submerged
- Test depth: 100 m (330 ft)
- Complement: 54 (7 officers + 47 non-officers and sailors)
- Armament: 8 × 533 mm (21 in) torpedo tubes (4 bow, 4 stern); 1 × 100 mm (4 in) / 47 caliber deck gun; 2 × twin 13.2 mm (0.52 in) anti-aircraft guns

Archimede was a Brin-class submarine built for the Royal Italian Navy (Regia Marina) during the 1930s.

== Design and description ==
The Brin-class submarines were improved versions of the preceding Archimede class. Two boats were replacements for submarines of that class that were secretly transferred to the Nationalists during the Spanish Civil War in 1937. They displaced 1,000 metric tons (980 long tons) surfaced and 1,254 metric tons (1,234 long tons) submerged. The submarines were 72.47 meters (237 ft 9 in) long, had a beam of 6.68 meters (21 ft 11 in) and a draft of 4.54 meters (14 ft 11 in). The class was partially double hulled.

For surface running, the boats were powered by two 1,500-brake-horsepower (1,119 kW) diesel engines, each driving one propeller shaft. When submerged, each propeller was driven by a 550-horsepower (410 kW) electric motor. They could reach 17.3 knots (32.0 km/h; 19.9 mph) on the surface and 7.8 knots (14.4 km/h; 9.0 mph) underwater. On the surface, the Brin class had a range of 9,000 nautical miles (17,000 km; 10,000 mi) at 8 knots (15 km/h; 9.2 mph), submerged, they had a range of 90 nmi (170 km; 100 mi) at 4 knots (7.4 km/h; 4.6 mph).

The boats were armed with eight internal 53.3 cm (21.0 in) torpedo tubes, four each in the bow and stern. They carried a total of 14 torpedoes. They were also armed with one 100 mm (4 in) deck gun for combat on the surface. The gun was initially mounted in the rear of the conning tower, but this was re-sited on the forward deck later in the war in the surviving boats and the large conning tower was re-built to a smaller design. The light anti-aircraft armament consisted of one or two pairs of 13.2 mm (0.52 in) machine guns.

== Construction and career ==
Archimede was built by Tosi shipyard in Taranto, laid down on 23 December 1937, and launched on 5 March 1939. The construction was conducted in secrecy to conceal the fact that the original Archimede of the Archimede-class submarine was transferred to the Spanish Nationalists in 1937 during the Spanish Civil War. According to the 1941 edition of Jane's Fighting Ships Archimede was believed lost in 1940.

After the boat was commissioned, she underwent trials at Taranto and then sailed to her assigned base at the Red Sea port of Massawa. She went from Taranto to Tobruk where she remained for two days. She then proceeded to Port Said remaining there one day. She arrived without incident at Massawa in the early summer of 1939, after a 15 days' trip out of Taranto. Archimede was part of the 82nd Squadron (VIII Submarine Group).

The first cruise out of Massawa started on 5 December 1939. She set out with two or three other submarines, went to Assab, held exercises mostly crash diving outside the port for five or six days, and then returned to Massawa.

The second cruise out of Massawa was held in January 1940. She again sailed down to Assab and held the same exercises as before. She was back in Massawa in 15 days, and the crew went ashore for two months to a rest camp near Asmara.

The third and last peace time cruise occurred in April 1940 when she visited Port Sudan where the crew spent two days in port. After a cruise of eight days she returned to Massawa where she was put in a floating dock for repairs. One torpedo tube was leaking, and the crash diving tank which had been unsatisfactory was removed and a new one was installed.

After Italy's entrance into World War II in June 1940, Archimede was ordered out to sea to patrol off the coast of French Somaliland. On 19 June Archimede left from Massawa under command of captain Elio Signorini. On 20 June some members of the crew fell sick due to leaking chloromethane from the air conditioning system, however no one paid attention to that at the time. During the night of 23 June four sailors died due to chloromethane poisoning, and at that point Commander Signorini decided to stop the mission and return to base. Due to the continuing health problems of the crew, Archimede had to head for Assab, where she arrived on 26 June at 08:30. Twenty four seriously poisoned men, including Commander Signorini and the chief machinist, were disembarked, and two of them later died bringing the total number of casualties to six. A temporary commanding officer was appointed who took Archimede from Assab to Massawa on 3 July. Archimede then was kept in port until September 1940 undergoing repairs, and the refrigerant in her air conditioning system was changed from chloromethane to freon.

During her second war mission, she was deployed off Perim Island for seven days, leaving Massawa on 20 December 1940 but she sighted no enemy traffic. Her next four missions were also uneventful, with each mission being of five or six day's duration.

In January 1941, when it became clear that Italian East Africa would eventually fall, it was decided to send submarines to Bordeaux to try to save them from either destruction or capture by the British. All submarines were modified for the journey: their fuel tanks were enlarged, some torpedoes, gun ammunition were removed as well as some non-critical items.

Archimede, under command of captain Mario Salvatori, left on 3 March 1941 together with Guglielmotti and headed to Bordeaux, in the occupied part of France. After circumnavigating Africa, and being refueled and restocked by the German tanker Northmark on her way, she finally arrived at Bordeaux on 7 May 1941. Guglielmotti arrived at Bordeaux on 6 May 1941. Overall, Archimede traveled more than 12,700 nautical miles (23,500 km; 14,600 mi) in 65 days to conclude her seventh war patrol. Upon her arrival, Archimede underwent maintenance and repairs which kept her out of operation until September 1941.

With Salvatori still as her commander, Archimede left Bordeaux on 10 October 1941 to patrol off Gibraltar. She arrived in her assigned zone on 21 October 1941. At dawn on 25 October she sighted six enemy destroyers and immediately submerged and soon heard the "pinging" of ASDIC. The destroyers depth-charged her from 08:00 to 13:00 and from 14:00 to 21:00. Her deck flooring was completely smashed, all lights were blown out, fuel tanks leaked, pumps were put out of order, the glass on instruments was demolished, manometers were crippled, and some torpedo tubes were leaking. Other than that the boat survived the attacks very well. She continued to operate about 600 miles west of Gibraltar and returned without any further incident to Bordeaux on 17 November to undergo two months worth of repairs.

In January 1942 captain Gianfranco Gazzana-Priaroggia took over the command of Archimede. On 17 January 1942 she left Bordeaux and headed to Lisbon. Archimede was tasked with observing and reporting on all traffic to and from the port. Five or six ships of Spanish and Argentinean ownership were sighted leaving the port. On 6 February 1942 she returned to Bordeaux. Two months of repairs followed during which the "old" 100/43 mm forward gun was removed and a new 100 mm (4 in)/47 caliber deck gun was installed.

In early May 1942, Archimede left Bordeaux for patrol mission of Brazilian coast. On 23 May 1942 she sighted a cruiser and a destroyer (possibly USS Milwaukee and USS Moffett) which captain Gazzana misidentified as Pensacola-class cruiser. Archimede launched two torpedoes, and explosions were heard, but the submarine had to dive and undergo a depth-charge attack by the destroyers. She sustained some damage to her electricals, but that didn't prevent her from continuing her patrol.

Finally on 15 June, on the Buenos Aires – Trinidad route she sighted a cargo ship SS Cardina (5,586 GRT) running under a Panamanian flag and carrying 7,000 tons of Linseed. At 12:45 local time Archimede fired a torpedo which hit the ship and caused an immediate listing. The crew abandoned ship a few minutes later, but when the ship did not appear to sink all hands returned to the ship within an hour. After a few repairs, the engine was started and the ship got underway. About 17:30 local time the engines were stopped and the crew abandoned ship again. Archimede fired another torpedo which struck on the port side tearing a huge hole in the hull. In addition, the submarine surfaced and commenced firing her deck gun. Three direct hits were made on the ship's hull which sank the ship in the position 4°45′N 40°55′W. The following day she attacked unsuccessfully US steamer SS Columbian.

On 15 September 1942 Archimede under command of captain Guido Saccardo departed for another patrol mission in the area between Freetown and Cape São Roque. After cruising in her zone for a few days, she sighted a British ocean liner converted to troopship SS Oronsay (20,043 GRT) early in the morning of 9 October 1942. At 5:15 commander Saccardo fired the first torpedo and missed. Zuliani, his executive officer, took over and made a hit with the second torpedo, three more torpedoes were fired, and the ship finally sank at 18:15 in the approximate position 04°29′N 20°58′W. During the following night Archimede attacked another ocean liner converted to troop transport, SS Nea Hellas (16,991 GRT). The torpedoes struck but did not explode and the ship could escape at maximum speed. On 17 November Archimede returned to the base.

At 05:00 on 15 February 1943 Archimede sailed out from Bordeaux for her twelfth and last mission. Twenty five days out of Bordeaux she arrived in her operating zone off the coast of Brazil, in the vicinity of St. Paul's Rocks. She patrolled the zone without sighting any enemy shipping for more than a month.

Finally, at 15:10 on 15 April 1943 United States Navy Consolidated PBY Catalina PBY-5A (83-P-5) of Squadron VP-83 based on Natal, Brazil while flying at 7,300 ft, sighted the submarine traveling surfaced at about 5–7 knots. After sighting the plane, Archimede opened fire from her anti-aircraft guns. At an altitude of 6,000 feet and at a range of about one half mile, it appeared that the submarine was about to submerge. The plane immediately dove at an angle of about 60° and at about 2,000 feet released all 4 bombs. The submarine sustained damage to her forward hatches which were blown off, the lighting installations were smashed and one diesel engine was rendered inoperative. Because of the damage to the forward hatches Archimede was unable to submerge. Forty five minutes after the first attack another Consolidated PBY Catalina PBY-5A (83-P-12) of the same squadron arrived on the scene. At about 1,500 yards both plane and submarine opened fire. In this first run the plane dropped a load of four bombs from an altitude of 50/100 feet. One bomb tore through the aft hatchway, and ignited the oil deposit at the bottom of the hatchway. The four primed torpedoes in the aft tubes also exploded. Archimede plunged stern first, with her bow sticking out at about 50° angle. Six minutes after the explosions were heard, at about 16:25, the submarine sank in the position 3°23′S 30°28′W. The planes observed about 30–40 survivors floating in the water, and three rafts were dropped for them. A plane sent the next day could not locate the survivors. Meanwhile, the rafts drifted for several days, and survivors sighted a steamer on day seven, but she didn't see them. Soon most of the people died due to the wounds, and lack of water. On the twenty ninth day after the sinking the raft washed ashore on the Island of Bailique near the Western shore of the Amazon River; there was only one survivor found alive weak and delirious by two Brazilian fishermen.

Ships sunk by Archimede
Date	Ship	Flag	Tonnage	Notes
15 June 1942	Cardina	(Panama)	5,586 GRT	freighter
9 October 1942	Oronsay	(United Kingdom)	20,043 GRT	troopship
Total:			25,629 GRT	
