= Archimede-class submarine =

1933 class of submarines of the Regia Marina

Class overview
- Name: Archimede class
- Builders: Cantieri navali Tosi di Taranto, Taranto
- Operators: Regia Marina; Spanish Navy; Royal Navy
- Built: 1930–1934
- In service: 1933–1958
- Completed: 4
- Lost: 1
- Retired: 3

General characteristics
- Type: Submarine
- Displacement: 986 t (970 long tons) (surfaced); 1,259 t (1,239 long tons) (submerged)
- Length: 70.5 m (231 ft 4 in)
- Beam: 6.87 m (22 ft 6 in)
- Draft: 4.12 m (13 ft 6 in)
- Installed power: 3,000 bhp (2,200 kW) (diesels); 1,100 hp (820 kW) (electric motors)
- Propulsion: 2 shafts; diesel-electric; 2 × diesel engines; 2 × electric motors
- Speed: 17 knots (31 km/h; 20 mph) (surfaced); 7.7 knots (14.3 km/h; 8.9 mph) (submerged)
- Range: 10,300 nmi (19,100 km; 11,900 mi) at 8 knots (15 km/h; 9.2 mph) (surfaced); 105 nmi (194 km; 121 mi) at 3 knots (5.6 km/h; 3.5 mph) (submerged)
- Test depth: 90 m (300 ft)
- Crew: 55
- Armament: 2 × single 100 mm (3.9 in) deck guns; 2 × single 13.2 mm (0.52 in) machine guns; 8 × 533 mm (21 in) torpedo tubes (4 bow, 4 stern)

The Archimede class were a group of four submarines built for the Regia Marina (Royal Italian Navy) in the early 1930s. The boats fought in the Spanish Civil War (under the Nationalist flag) and in World War II. In Spanish service, two boats were known as the General Mola class; these were taken out of service in 1959.

== Design ==
The ships were designed by the firm Cavallini and were a partially double hulled design. They were an enlarged version of the Settembrini-class submarine with ballast tanks rearranged, greater range, fuel and torpedo capacity for ocean service. Like most of the later ocean-going submarines of the Italian navy, their deck armament consisting of two 100 mm (3.9 in) guns was conceived to deal with armed merchantmen in surface combat. (Note: That was the case of the Marcello-class submarine Comandante Cappellini, which on 5 and 14 January 1941 sank the British steamship Shakespear and then engaged in gunnery with the cargo/passenger ship (additionally carrying 100 troops Eumaeus off Cabo Verde when two torpedoes failed to sink it. Another example occurred when the Brin-class submarine Torricelli faced three British destroyers and a sloop while surfaced in the Red Sea. Before being sunk, the submarine hit the sloop and damaged the destroyer HMS Khartoum but was sunk in the action. A torpedo fault later the day caused a fire which led to magazine explosion and Khartoum was beached at Perim but the cause is not attributed to the gun battle.) They also mounted two 13.2 mm (0.52 in) anti-aircraft machine guns. The number of torpedoes was increased from 12 on the Settembrini class to 16.

== Boats ==
All boats were built by the shipyard of Franco Tosi at Taranto, between 1930 and 1934.

Torricelli and Archimede took part in the Spanish Civil war under the Italian flag since 1936, carrying out undercover operations. Eventually both submarines were secretly delivered to the Spanish nationalists in April 1937.

List of Archimede-class submarines
Ship	Namesake	Launched	Fate
Archimede / General Sanjurjo	Archimedes/Jose Sanjurjo (Note: José Sanjurjo was one of the leaders of the nationalist uprising, he was killed in an aircraft accident in July 1936)	10 December 1933	During the second half of 1936 she operated in Spanish waters covertly as Archimede. Transferred to the Spanish nationalist navy in April 1937, renamed General Sanjurjo. She sank the Republican troop transport Ciudad de Barcelona on 30 May 1937 and the British Endymion near 37°19′3″N 1°3′16″W on 21 January 1938. Involved in an incident with HMS Torbay on 7 February 1943, during WWII, after the British submarine misidentified her as Italian. Stricken in 1959
Galileo Ferraris	Galileo Ferraris	11 August 1934	Sunk 25 October 1941 off Gibraltar by the combined action of a RAF PBY-5A Catalina flying boat and the destroyer HMS Lamerton at the position 37°07′0″N 14°19′0″W
Galileo Galilei	Galileo Galilei	19 March 1934	On 16 June 1940, she sank the Norwegian tanker James Stove off Aden, in the Red Sea. Captured two days later by the British armed trawler HMS Moonstone. Commissioned into the Royal Navy as HMS X2, scrapped in 1946
Evangelista Torricelli / General Mola	Evangelista Torricelli/Emilio Mola (Note: Mola was the third of the leaders of the July 1936 military coup that started the civil war. After his death in an aircraft accident Franco was left as the leader of the Nationalists.)	27 March 1934	She torpedoed and disabled the Republican Almirante Cervera-class cruiser Miguel de Cervantes in 1936, still under Italian flag as Torricelli. Transferred to the Spanish nationalist navy in April 1937, renamed General Mola. She sank the Republican transport Cabo Palos on 26 July 1937 and the Dutch freighter Hanna on 2 January 1938. She also damaged beyond repair the Greek Lena on 30 March. Stricken in 1959

== See also ==
- Italian submarines of World War II
- List of foreign ships wrecked or lost in the Spanish Civil War
