= Robert R. Scott =

US Navy Medal of Honor recipient (1915–1941)

Robert Raymond Scott
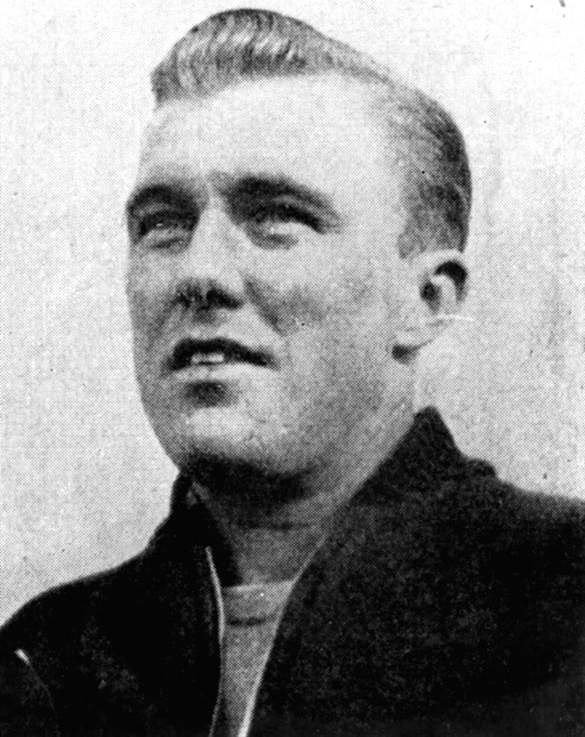
- Machinist's Mate First Class Robert R. Scott
- Born: July 13, 1915; Massillon, Ohio, US
- Died: December 7, 1941 (aged 26); Pearl Harbor, Territory of Hawaii
- Burial place: Arlington National Cemetery, Arlington, Virginia
- Military career
- Allegiance: United States of America
- Branch: United States Navy
- Service years: 1938-1941
- Rank: Machinist's Mate First Class
- Unit: USS California
- Conflicts: World War II: Attack on Pearl Harbor †
- Awards: Medal of Honor, Purple Heart, American Campaign Ribbon

Robert Raymond Scott (July 13, 1915 – December 7, 1941) was a United States Navy sailor who was posthumously awarded the Medal of Honor for his actions during the attack on Pearl Harbor.

== Biography ==
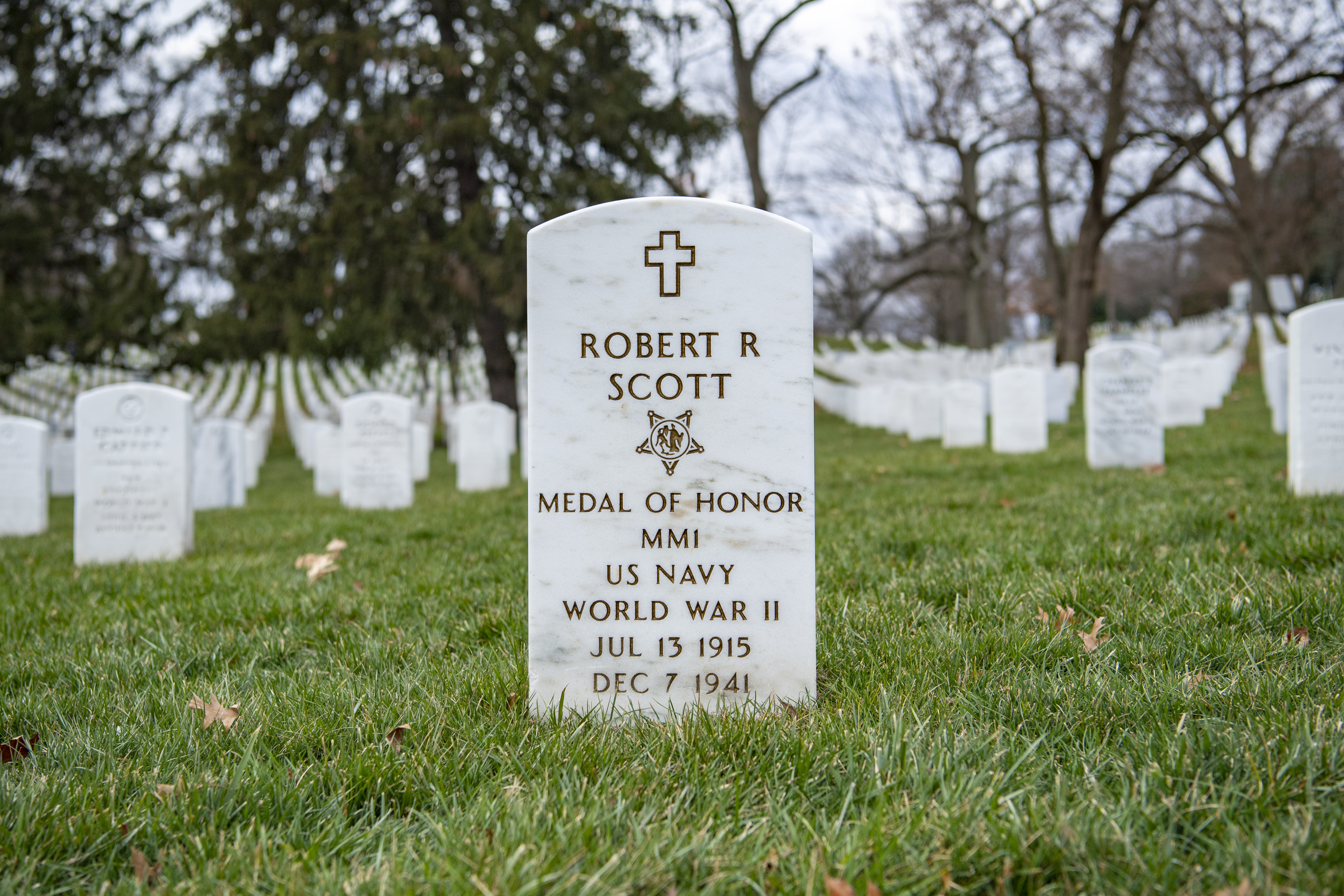
Grave at Arlington National Cemetery

Robert Raymond Scott was born in Massillon, Ohio on July 13, 1915, and enlisted in the United States Navy on April 18, 1938. Machinist's Mate First Class Scott was assigned to USS California when the Japanese attacked Pearl Harbor on December 7, 1941. The compartment containing the air compressor to which Scott was assigned as his battle station was flooded as a result of a torpedo hit. The remainder of the personnel evacuated the space, but Scott refused to leave, saying words to the effect that "This is my station and I will stay and give them air as long as the guns are going." He was posthumously awarded the Medal of Honor for his heroism.

== Medal of Honor citation ==
Citation:

For conspicuous devotion to duty, extraordinary courage and complete disregard of his own life, above and beyond the call of duty, during the attack on the Fleet in Pearl Harbor by Japanese forces on 7 December 1941. The compartment, in the U.S.S. California, in which the air compressor, to which Scott was assigned as his battle station, was flooded as the result of a torpedo hit. The remainder of the personnel evacuated that compartment but Scott refused to leave, saying words to the effect "This is my station and I will stay and give them air as long as the guns are going."

== Awards and Decorations ==

1st row	Medal of Honor		
2nd row	Purple Heart	Combat Action Ribbon Retroactively Awarded, 1999	American Defense Service Medal with 'Fleet' Clasp
3rd row	American Campaign Medal	European–African–Middle Eastern Campaign Medal with 1 Campaign star	World War II Victory Medal

== Namesake ==
In 1943, the destroyer escort USS Scott (DE-214) was named in his honor. Scott was also a former student at Ohio State University where the Scott House dormitory is named after him.

== See also ==
- List of Medal of Honor recipients
