= Italian submarine Evangelista Torricelli (1934) =

Italian submarine

History

Fascist Italy
- Name: Evangelista Torricelli
- Namesake: Evangelista Torricelli
- Builder: Cantieri navali Tosi di Taranto, Taranto
- Launched: 27 May 1934
- Fate: Transferred to Spanish Nationalists, April 1937

Francoist Spain
- Name: General Mola
- Acquired: April 1937
- Fate: Scrapped, 1959

General characteristics
- Class & type: Archimede-class submarine
- Displacement: 986 t (970 long tons) (surfaced); 1,259 t (1,239 long tons) (submerged)
- Length: 70.5 m (231 ft 4 in)
- Beam: 6.87 m (22 ft 6 in)
- Draft: 4.12 m (13 ft 6 in)
- Installed power: 3,000 bhp (2,200 kW) (diesels); 1,100 hp (820 kW) (electric motors)
- Propulsion: 2 shafts; Diesel-electric; 2 × diesel engines; 2 × electric motors
- Speed: 17 knots (31 km/h; 20 mph) (surfaced); 7.7 knots (14.3 km/h; 8.9 mph) (submerged)
- Range: 10,300 nmi (19,100 km; 11,900 mi) at 8 knots (15 km/h; 9.2 mph) (surfaced); 105 nmi (194 km; 121 mi) at 3 knots (5.6 km/h; 3.5 mph) (submerged)
- Test depth: 90 m (300 ft)
- Crew: 55
- Armament: 2 × single 100 mm (3.9 in) deck guns; 2 × single 13.2 mm (0.52 in) machine guns; 8 × 533 mm (21 in) torpedo tubes (4 bow, 4 stern)

Evangelista Torricelli was one of four Archimede-class submarines built for the Regia Marina (Royal Italian Navy) during the 1930s. She served in the Spanish Civil War of 1936–1939, and was transferred to the Armada Española (Spanish Navy) of Nationalists in 1937, renamed as General Mola.

== Design and description ==
The Archimede class was an improved and enlarged version of the earlier Settembrini class. They displaced 986 metric tons (970 long tons) surfaced and 1,259 metric tons (1,239 long tons) submerged. The submarines were 70.5 meters (231 ft 4 in) long, had a beam of 6.87 meters (22 ft 6 in) and a draft of 4.12 meters (13 ft 6 in). They had an operational diving depth of 90 meters (300 ft) Their crew numbered 55 officers and enlisted men.

For surface running, the boats were powered by two 1,500-brake-horsepower (1,119 kW) diesel engines, each driving one propeller shaft. When submerged each propeller was driven by a 550-horsepower (410 kW) electric motor. They could reach 17 knots (31 km/h; 20 mph) on the surface and 7.7 knots (14.3 km/h; 8.9 mph) underwater. On the surface, the Archimede class had a range of 10,300 nautical miles (19,100 km; 11,900 mi) at 8 knots (15 km/h; 9.2 mph); submerged, they had a range of 105 nmi (194 km; 121 mi) at 3 knots (5.6 km/h; 3.5 mph).

The boats were armed with eight 53.3-centimeter (21 in) torpedo tubes, four each in the bow and in the stern for which they carried a total of 16 torpedoes. They were also armed with a pair of 100 mm (3.9 in) deck guns, one each fore and aft of the conning tower, for combat on the surface. Their anti-aircraft armament consisted of two single 13.2-millimeter (0.52 in) machine guns.

== Construction and career ==
Evangelista Torricelli was laid down by Cantieri navali Tosi di Taranto at their Taranto shipyard in 1931, launched on 27 May 1934 and completed later that year. During the Spanish Civil War the boat torpedoed and badly damaged the Republican light cruiser Miguel Cervantes while at anchor off Cartagena on 22 November 1936. An attack on the battleship Jaime I was thwarted when the British destroyer Glowworm got in the way. During a second patrol in January 1937, she bombarded Barcelona harbor on the night of 18/19 January and missed the 1,527-gross register ton (GRT) cargo ship SS J. J. Sister with three torpedoes off Tarragona on 19 January. The following day the boat narrowly missed colliding with the 2,174 GRT cargo ship SS Cabo Sucratif. She was transferred to the Nationalists in April 1937.

== Bibliography ==
- Bagnasco, Erminio (1977). Submarines of World War Two. Annapolis, Maryland: Naval Institute Press. ISBN 0-87021-962-6.
- Brescia, Maurizio (2012). Mussolini's Navy: A Reference Guide to the Regina Marina 1930–45. Annapolis, Maryland: Naval Institute Press. ISBN 978-1-59114-544-8.
- Chesneau, Roger, ed. (1980). Conway's All the World's Fighting Ships 1922–1946. London: Conway Maritime Press. ISBN 0-85177-146-7.
- Frank, Willard C. Jr. (1989). "Question 12/88". Warship International. XXVI (1): 95–97. ISSN 0043-0374.
