= Brin-class submarine =

Italian submarine class

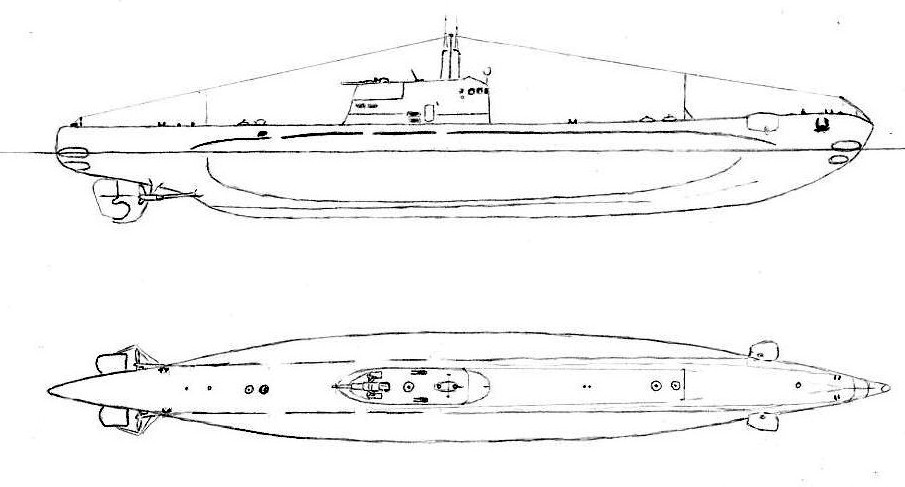

Class overview
- Name: Brin-class submarines
- Builders: Tosi
- Operators: Regia Marina
- Preceded by: Archimede class
- Succeeded by: Liuzzi class
- Built: 1936–1939
- In commission: 1938–1948
- Completed: 5
- Lost: 4
- Scrapped: 1

General characteristics
- Type: Submarine
- Displacement: 1,000 long tons (1,016 t) surfaced; 1,245 long tons (1,265 t) submerged
- Length: 72.47 m (237 ft 9 in)
- Beam: 6.68 m (21 ft 11 in)
- Draft: 4.54 m (14 ft 11 in)
- Installed power: 3,000 bhp (2,200 kW) (diesels); 1,300 hp (970 kW) (electric motors)
- Propulsion: Diesel-electric; 2 × diesel engines; 2 × electric motors
- Speed: 17.3 knots (32.0 km/h; 19.9 mph) surfaced; 8 knots (15 km/h; 9.2 mph) submerged
- Range: 9,000 nmi (17,000 km; 10,000 mi) at 7.8 knots (14.4 km/h; 9.0 mph) surfaced; 90 nmi (170 km; 100 mi) at 4 knots (7.4 km/h; 4.6 mph) submerged
- Test depth: 80 m (260 ft)
- Complement: 58
- Armament: 8 × 533 mm (21 in) torpedo tubes (4 bow, 4 stern); 1 × 100 mm (3.9 in) deck gun; 2 × twin 13.2 mm (0.52 in) machine guns

The Brin-class submarine was a group of five long-range submarines built for the Royal Italian Navy (Regia Marina) during the 1930s.

== Design and description ==
The Brin-class submarines were improved versions of the preceding Archimede class. Two boats were replacements for submarines of that class that were secretly transferred to the Nationalists during the Spanish Civil War in 1937. They displaced 1,000 long tons (1,000 t) surfaced and 1,245 long tons (1,265 t) submerged. The submarines were 72.47 meters (237 ft 9 in) long, had a beam of 6.68 meters (21 ft 11 in) and a draft of 4.54 meters (14 ft 11 in). The class was partially double hulled.

For surface running, the boats were powered by two 1,500-brake-horsepower (1,119 kW) diesel engines, each driving one propeller shaft. When submerged each propeller was driven by a 550-horsepower (410 kW) electric motor. They could reach 17.3 knots (32.0 km/h; 19.9 mph) on the surface and 7.8 knots (14.4 km/h; 9.0 mph) underwater. On the surface, the Brin class had a range of 9,000 nautical miles (17,000 km; 10,000 mi) at 8 knots (15 km/h; 9.2 mph), submerged, they had a range of 90 nmi (170 km; 100 mi) at 4 knots (7.4 km/h; 4.6 mph).

The boats were armed with eight internal 53.3 cm (21.0 in) torpedo tubes, four each in the bow and stern. They carried a total of 14 torpedoes. They were also armed with one 100 mm (3.9 in) deck gun for combat on the surface. The gun was initially mounted in the rear of the conning tower, but this was re-sited on the forward deck later in the war in the surviving boats and the large conning tower was re-built to a smaller design. The light anti-aircraft armament consisted of one or two pairs of 13.2 mm (0.52 in) machine guns.

== Ships ==
Ship	Namesake	Launched	Fate
Brin	Benedetto Brin	3 April 1938	Surrendered to the Allies in 1943; discarded in February 1948.
Galvani	Luigi Galvani	22 May 1938	Sunk by British sloop HMS Falmouth near Persian Gulf on 26 June 1940.
Guglielmotti	Alberto Guglielmotti	11 September 1938	Sank Greek tanker Atlas in the Red Sea on 6 September 1940. Torpedoed by HMS Unbeaten on 17 March 1942.
Archimede	Archimedes	5 March 1939	Escaped from East Africa in 1941 to Bordeaux. Sunk by US Navy Catalina flying boats off Brazil on 15 April 1943.
Torricelli	Evangelista Torricelli	26 March 1939	Scuttled in the Red Sea on 23 June 1940 after an engagement with the British destroyers HMS Kandahar, HMS Khartoum, HMS Kingston, and sloop HMS Shoreham. The submarine was commanded by Salvatore Pelosi.

== See also ==
Equivalent submarines of the same era

- O 21 class
- T class
- Aurore class
- Orzeł class
- Mackerel class
- S class
- Type VII
