= Italian submarine Luigi Settembrini =

Italian submarine

History

Kingdom of Italy
- Name: Luigi Settembrini
- Builder: Cantieri navali Tosi di Taranto, Taranto
- Launched: 28 September 1930
- Fate: Sunk, 15 November 1944

General characteristics
- Class & type: Settembrini-class submarine
- Displacement: 953 t (938 long tons) (surfaced); 1,153 t (1,135 long tons) (submerged)
- Length: 69.11 m (226 ft 9 in)
- Beam: 6.61 m (21 ft 8 in)
- Draft: 4.45 m (14 ft 7 in)
- Installed power: 3,000 bhp (2,200 kW) (diesels); 1,400 hp (1,000 kW) (electric motors)
- Propulsion: 2 shafts; diesel-electric; 2 × diesel engines; 2 × electric motors
- Speed: 17.5 knots (32.4 km/h; 20.1 mph) (surfaced); 7.7 knots (14.3 km/h; 8.9 mph) (submerged)
- Range: 6,200 nmi (11,500 km; 7,100 mi) at 7.3 knots (13.5 km/h; 8.4 mph) (surfaced); 100 nmi (190 km; 120 mi) at 3 knots (5.6 km/h; 3.5 mph) (submerged)
- Test depth: 80 m (260 ft)
- Crew: 56
- Armament: 1 × single 102 mm (4 in) deck gun; 2–4 × single 13.2 mm (0.52 in) machine guns; 8 × 533 mm (21 in) torpedo tubes (4 bow, 4 stern)

Luigi Settembrini was the lead ship of her class of two submarines built for the Regia Marina (Royal Italian Navy) during the early 1930s. She played a minor role in the Spanish Civil War of 1936–1939 supporting the Spanish Nationalists.

== Design and description ==
The Settembrini class was an improved and enlarged version of the preceding Mameli-class submarines. They displaced 953 metric tons (938 long tons) surfaced and 1,153 metric tons (1,135 long tons) submerged. The submarines were 69.11 meters (226 ft 9 in) long, had a beam of 6.61 meters (21 ft 8 in) and a draft of 4.45 meters (14 ft 7 in). They had an operational diving depth of 80 meters (260 ft). Their crew numbered 56 officers and enlisted men.

For surface running, the boats were powered by two 1,500-brake-horsepower (1,119 kW) diesel engines, each driving one propeller shaft. When submerged each propeller was driven by a 700-horsepower (522 kW) electric motor. They could reach 17.5 knots (32.4 km/h; 20.1 mph) on the surface and 7.7 knots (14.3 km/h; 8.9 mph) underwater. On the surface, the Settembrini class had a range of 6,200 nautical miles (11,500 km; 7,100 mi) at 7.3 knots (13.5 km/h; 8.4 mph); submerged, they had a range of 100 nmi (190 km; 120 mi) at 3 knots (5.6 km/h; 3.5 mph).

The boats were armed with eight 53.3-centimeter (21 in) torpedo tubes, four each in the bow and stern for which they carried a total of 12 torpedoes. They were also armed with a single 102-millimeter (4 in) deck gun forward of the conning tower for combat on the surface. Their anti-aircraft armament consisted of two or four 13.2-millimeter (0.52 in) machine guns.

== Construction and career ==
Luigi Settembrini was launched by Cantieri navali Tosi di Taranto at their Taranto shipyard on 28 September 1930 and completed later that year. During the Spanish Civil War she made one patrol in the Eastern Mediterranean during which she attacked the 3,100-gross register ton (GRT) Soviet cargo ship SS Blagoev off the island of Skyros on 1 September 1937. Luigi Settimbrini missed with her first torpedo, but the boat surfaced and fired a warning shot, which caused the freighter's crew to abandon ship. The submarine then fired a pair of torpedoes which sank the Soviet ship. On 15 November 1944 the submarine was rammed and sunk in the Atlantic Ocean west of Gibraltar (36°11′N 19°45′W) by USS Frament ( United States Navy) that was towing her. Forty-two Italian crew and the three men of the US liaison team aboard were killed. The eight survivors were rescued by USS Frament.
