= HMS Unbeaten =

Submarine of the Royal Navy

Coordinates: 46°50′N 6°51′W

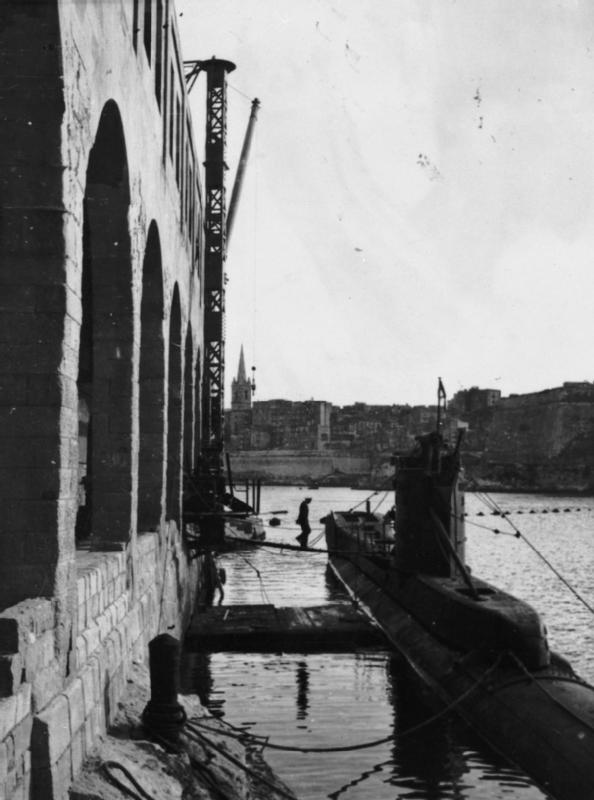
- HMS Unbeaten moored alongside a dock at Malta

History

United Kingdom
- Name: HMS Unbeaten
- Builder: Vickers-Armstrongs, Barrow-in-Furness
- Laid down: 22 November 1939
- Launched: 9 July 1940
- Commissioned: 10 November 1940
- Fate: Sunk 11 November 1942
- Badge

General characteristics
- Class & type: U-class submarine
- Displacement: Surfaced - 540 tons standard, 630 tons full load; Submerged - 730 tons
- Length: 58.22 m (191 ft 0 in)
- Beam: 4.90 m (16 ft 1 in)
- Draught: 4.62 m (15 ft 2 in)
- Propulsion: 2 shaft diesel-electric; 2 Paxman Ricardo diesel generators + electric motors; 615 / 825 hp
- Speed: 11.25 kn (20.84 km/h; 12.95 mph) max surfaced; 10 kn (19 km/h; 12 mph) max submerged
- Complement: 27-31
- Armament: 4 x bow internal 21 inch (533 mm)torpedo tubes - 8 - 10 torpedoes; 1 x 3-inch (76 mm) gun

HMS Unbeaten was a U-class submarine, of the second group of that class, built by Vickers-Armstrongs, Barrow-in-Furness. She was laid down on 22 November 1939 and was commissioned on 10 November 1940. So far she has been the only ship of the Royal Navy to bear the name Unbeaten.

== Career ==
Unbeaten spent much of her career operating in the Mediterranean, where she sank the Italian sailing vessel V 51 / Alfa, the Vichy-French merchant PLM 20, the Italian submarine Guglielmotti and the German submarine U-374. She also claimed to have sunk two sailing vessels with gunfire on 15 July 1941 at Marsa Zuag roads, Libya, but Italian sources only confirm damage to one fishing vessel.

Unbeaten also lightly damaged the Italian merchant Vettor Pisani on 16 March 1942. She also unsuccessfully attacked the Italian merchant Silvio Scaroni, the Italian troop transport Esperia and a large Italian troop transport, thought to be either Oceania or Neptunia.

== Sinking ==
After a refit in Chatham, and subsequent workup, Unbeaten was attached to the Third Submarine Flotilla in Scotland. Having sailed from Holy Loch on her last patrol, Unbeaten completed Operation Bluestone, landing an agent in Spain near Bayona. She then completed her patrol in the Bay of Biscay and was returning to the United Kingdom when she went missing. It is believed that she was probably attacked and sunk in error by a Royal Air Force Wellington of No. 172 Squadron, Coastal Command in the Bay of Biscay on 11 November 1942. She was lost with all hands.
