= HMS Moonstone (T90) =

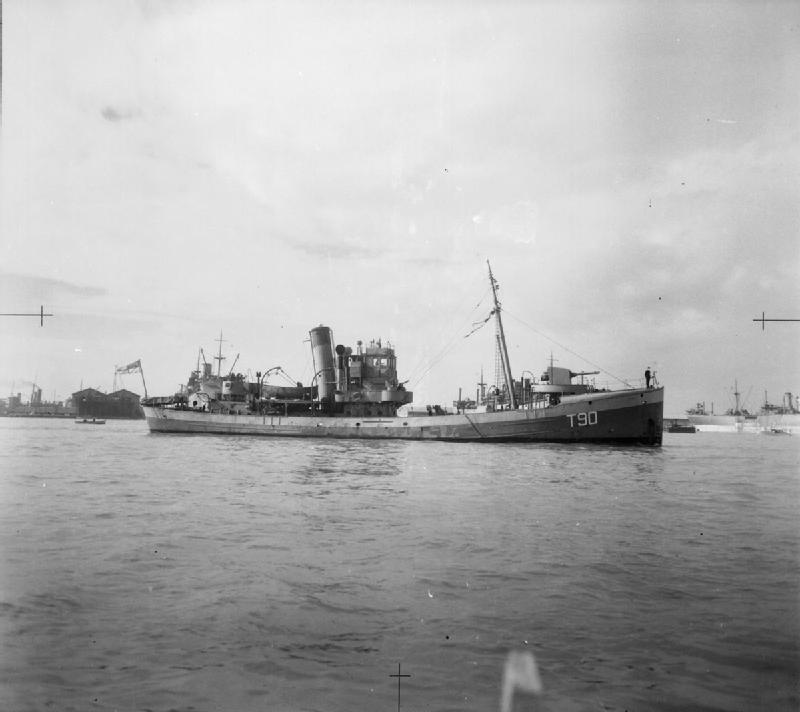
- HMS Moonstone during the Second World War

History

United Kingdom
- Name: HMS Moonstone
- Operator: Royal Navy
- Builder: Cook, Welton & Gemmell, Beverley
- Yard number: 592
- Launched: 31 July 1934
- Completed: 30 August 1934
- Commissioned: 1939
- Fate: Sold 1946, scrapped 1964

General characteristics
- Class & type: Armed trawler
- Tonnage: 390 GRT
- Displacement: 615 tons
- Length: 151.9 ft (46.3 m)
- Beam: 25.6 ft (7.8 m)
- Propulsion: 105 hp
- Speed: 11.6 kn (21.5 km/h)
- Sensors & processing systems: ASDIC
- Armament: Depth charges; 1 × 4 inch gun

HMS Moonstone was an armed trawler of the Royal Navy employed in anti-submarine warfare duties during the Second World War. While serving in the Mediterranean Sea she captured the Italian submarine Galileo Galilei.

== Early history ==
Built as Lady Madeline in 1934 by Cook, Welton and Gemmell, she was operated as a fishing trawler by Jutland Amalgamated Trawlers, of Hull, until the outbreak of the Second World War in 1939. She was requisitioned by the Admiralty and converted for war use, principally against submarines. She was renamed Moonstone and commissioned with the pennant number T90.

== Service history ==
Moonstone was posted to the Mediterranean as part of the 4th AS (anti-submarine) Patrol Group, and later to the Red Sea. In June 1940 Italy joined the war against the Allies, and the Royal Navy commenced operations against the Regia Marina. On 16 June Moonstone rescued the crew of the Norwegian tanker James Stove which had been sunk by the Italian submarine Galileo Galilei earlier that day. On 18 June Galileo Galilei was sighted and attacked by British aircraft, and Moonstone was dispatched to find her. On 19 June Moonstone obtained an ASDIC contact and attacked, dropping two depth charges. The submarine's captain, realizing his opponent was smaller and less heavily armed, and troubled by an escape of poisonous fumes in the boat, chose to fight on the surface, where he would still have the advantage. Breaking the surface Galileo Galilei’s crew manned her guns and got off the first shot, but this missed; Moonstone bore down and fired, hitting the submarine's bridge and killing or wounding the bridge crew, including her captain. Unable to continue, Galileo Galilei surrendered and was taken in hand by the trawler. Later, the destroyer Kandahar joined up, and took the submarine in tow to Aden. The submarine had suffered 12 killed and 4 wounded; Moonstone had no casualties. For this effort Moonstone's skipper, bosun William Moorman, was awarded the DSC and referred for an officer's commission. PO Frederick Quested, in charge of the gun crew, received the DSM.

== Later history ==
At the end of hostilities Moonstone was decommissioned and in 1946 returned into civilian service. Renamed Red Lancer she again operated as a fishing trawler until she was scrapped in 1964.
