= Alberto Guglielmotti =

Italian theologian and historian (1812–1892)

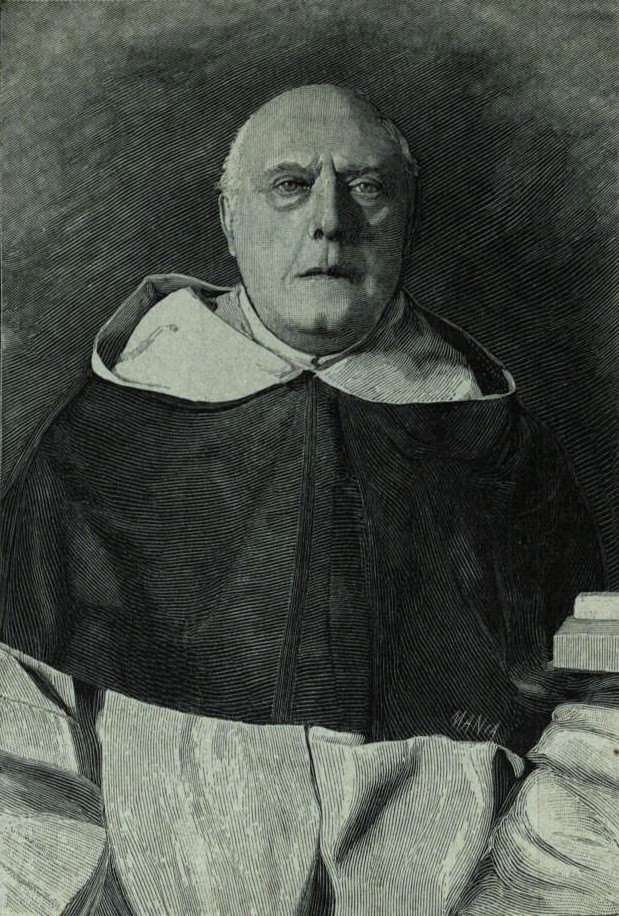
Alberto Guglielmotti

Alberto Guglielmotti (3 February 1812 – 31 October 1893) was a Dominican order priest and writer. He was best recognized for his histories about the naval battles and exploits of seamen from the Italian peninsula.

== Biography ==
He was born in Civitavecchia, baptized al secolo as Francesco Maria Guglielmotti. he father was an officer of the Marine, who served as councillor in Ragusa, Sicily and Civitavecchia. After attending seminary in Rome, he served as professor of physics and mathematics at the Minerva school. He later became librarian of the Biblioteca Casanatense.

He soon dedicated himself to writing mainly about naval history. Including I Bastioni d'Antonio di Sangallo per fortificare Civitavecchia (1860). His first major book was Marcantonio Colonna alla Battaglia di Lepanto (1862). Ten years later, he published Storia della Marina Pontificia nel medievo; by 1893, this had expanded to the history to ten volumes chronicling from dal principio a noi. He published La guerra dei pirati e la Marina pontificia del 1500-1560 (1876) which detailed the predations by Barbary pirates and the response of the Papal navies.

A monument in his honor was erected in Civitavecchia and two submarines of the Italian navy was named after him. He served as a correspondent of the Accademia della Crusca and the Lincei.
