= USS Frament =

Buckley-class destroyer escort

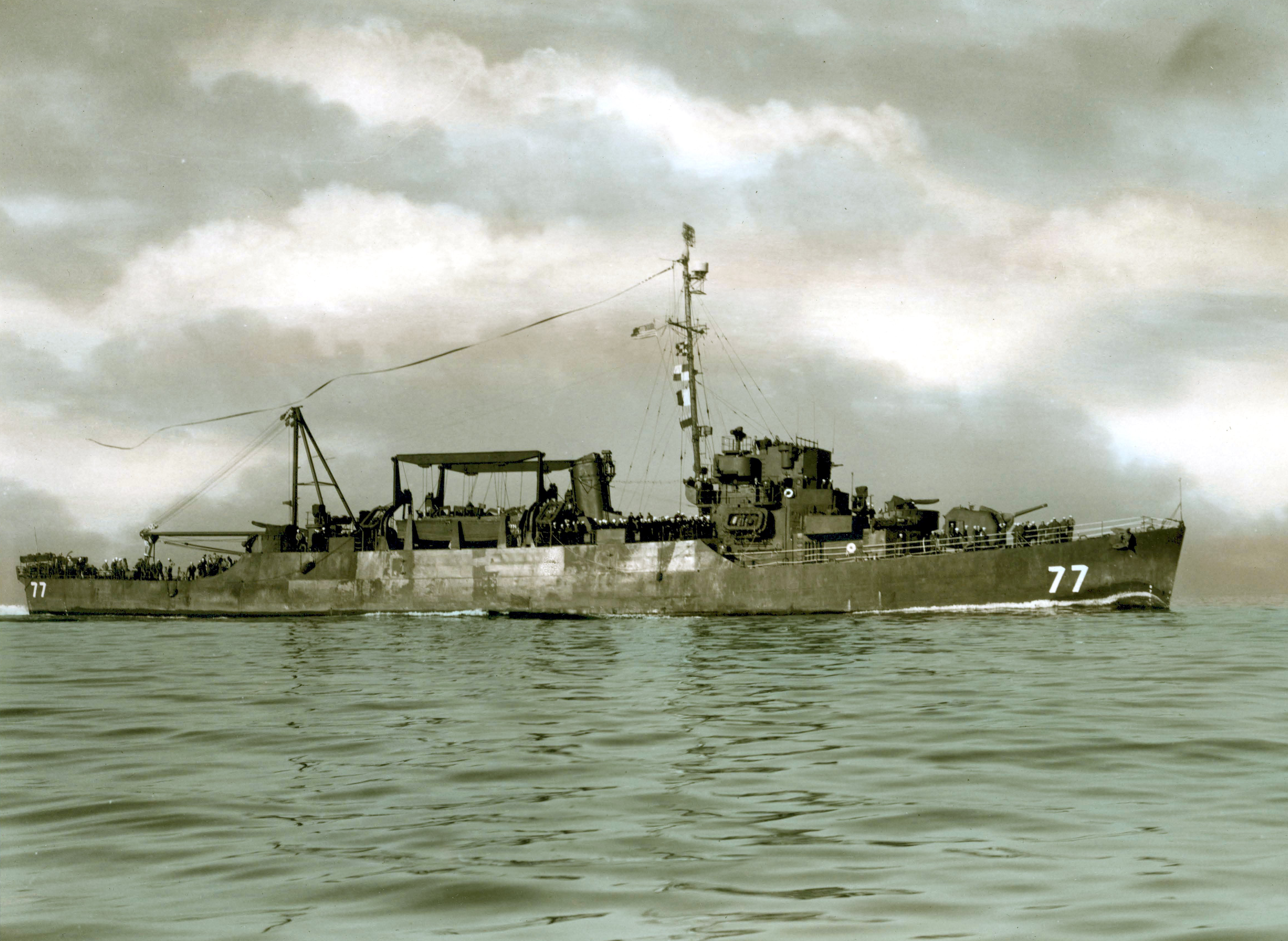

History

United States
- Builder: Bethlehem Steel Company, Quincy, Massachusetts
- Laid down: 1 May 1943
- Launched: 28 June 1943
- Commissioned: 15 August 1943
- Decommissioned: 3 December 1944
- Reclassified: APD-77, 15 December 1944
- Recommissioned: March(?) 1945
- Decommissioned: 30 May 1946
- Stricken: 1 June 1960
- Honors and awards: 1 battle star (WWII service)
- Fate: Transferred to Ecuador July 1961; fate unknown

General characteristics
- Class & type: Buckley-class destroyer escort
- Displacement: 1,740 tons full; 1,400 tons, standard
- Length: 306 ft (93 m)
- Beam: 37 ft (11.3 m)
- Draft: 9 ft 5 in (2.87 m)
- Propulsion: GE turbo-electric drive, 12,000 hp (8.9 MW); two propellers
- Speed: 24 knots (44 km/h)
- Range: 4,940 nautical miles at 12 knots; (9,200 km at 22 km/h)
- Complement: 15 officers, 198 men
- Armament: 3 × 3 in (76 mm)/50 DP guns, 3 × 21 in (53 cm) torpedo tubes, 1 × 1.1 in (28 mm)/75 quad AA gun, 8 × 20 mm cannon, 1 × hedgehog projector, 2 × depth charge tracks, 8 × K-gun depth charge projectors

USS Frament (DE-677/APD-77) was a Buckley-class destroyer escort in the United States Navy.

The ship was named after Paul Stanley Frament, a marine killed during the Guadalcanal campaign in November 1942.

== Construction and commissioning ==
Frament was launched on 28 June 1943 by Bethlehem Steel Company's Fore River Shipyard, Quincy, Massachusetts; sponsored by Mrs. Edward A. Frament, mother of Pharmacist's Mate Third Class Frament; and commissioned on 15 August 1943.

== DE-677 – Atlantic ==
Frament began the demanding tasks of Atlantic convoy escort on 19 October 1943, when she sailed from New York to escort tankers to Curaçao and thence to Derry, Northern Ireland. Sailing out of New York, and occasionally Boston, she escorted six convoys to Northern Ireland, one to Cherbourg, France, and one to Gibraltar, in the period from 15 December 1943 to 3 December 1944.

At 02:23 hrs on 15 November 1944, at 36°11′N 19°45′W (in the North Atlantic about 700 nmi (1,300 km) west of Gibraltar), Frament mistakenly rammed and sank the Italian submarine Luigi Settembrini which Frament was escorting to Bermuda, where the Italians were to provide aid in anti-submarine warfare training. Of the 42-strong crew of the Settembrini, only 14 survivors were rescued by Frament. USS Scott (DE-214) was detached from a convoy bound for the Mediterranean to help search for Italian survivors, and then escorted Frament back to Boston, arriving on 3 December.

== APD-77 – Pacific ==
After a hasty decommissioning, Frament began conversion to a high-speed transport; she was reclassified APD-77 on 15 December 1944.

After training on both coasts, Frament arrived at Pearl Harbor on 3 April 1945 for duty training with underwater demolition teams in the Hawaiian Islands. Convoy escort duty took her to Eniwetok, Ulithi, and Leyte in May, and on the 29th she arrived at Okinawa, where she joined the outer patrol screen guarding the great number of ships off the island.

Assigned to rescue duty in June, she proved herself on the 10th, when she and several smaller craft saved every man of William D. Porter (DD-579), when that destroyer was sunk by a suicide plane. Returning to the Philippines at the close of July, Frament trained for the planned invasion of the Japanese home islands, and at the close of the war, took up duty with minesweepers operating in the Yellow Sea. She served on occupation duty until 1 January 1946, when she sailed from Shanghai for the east coast. On 30 May 1946 Frament was placed out of commission in reserve at Green Cove Springs, Florida.

Stricken from the Navy Register on 1 June 1960, the former Frament was transferred to Ecuador in July 1961 for use as a power hulk.

== Awards ==
Frament received one battle star for World War II service.
