= Italian submarine Archimede (1933) =

Italian submarine

History

Kingdom of Italy
- Name: Archimede
- Namesake: Archimedes
- Builder: Cantieri navali Tosi di Taranto, Taranto
- Laid down: 1931
- Launched: 10 December 1933
- Commissioned: 1934–1935
- Fate: Transferred to Francoist Spain, April 1937

Francoist Spain
- Name: General Sanjurjo
- Acquired: 1937
- Fate: Scrapped, 1959

General characteristics
- Class & type: Archimede-class submarine
- Displacement: 986 t (970 long tons) (surfaced); 1,259 t (1,239 long tons) (submerged)
- Length: 70.5 m (231 ft 4 in)
- Beam: 6.87 m (22 ft 6 in)
- Draft: 4.12 m (13 ft 6 in)
- Installed power: 3,000 bhp (2,200 kW) (diesels); 1,100 hp (820 kW) (electric motors)
- Propulsion: 2 shafts; Diesel-electric; 2 × diesel engines; 2 × electric motors
- Speed: 17 knots (31 km/h; 20 mph) (surfaced); 7.7 knots (14.3 km/h; 8.9 mph) (submerged)
- Range: 10,300 nmi (19,100 km; 11,900 mi) at 8 knots (15 km/h; 9.2 mph) (surfaced); 105 nmi (194 km; 121 mi) at 3 knots (5.6 km/h; 3.5 mph) (submerged)
- Test depth: 90 m (300 ft)
- Crew: 55
- Armament: 2 × single 100 mm (3.9 in) deck guns; 2 × single 13.2 mm (0.52 in) machine guns; 8 × 533 mm (21 in) torpedo tubes (4 bow, 4 stern)

Archimede was the lead ship of her class of four submarines built for the Regia Marina (Royal Italian Navy) during the early 1930s. She was transferred to the Armada Española (Spanish Navy) of Nationalists in 1937, renamed General Sanjurjo, and served in the Spanish Civil War of 1936–1939.

== Design and description ==
The Archimede class was an improved and enlarged version of the earlier Settembrini class. They displaced 986 metric tons (970 long tons) surfaced and 1,259 metric tons (1,239 long tons) submerged. The submarines were 70.5 meters (231 ft 4 in) long, had a beam of 6.87 meters (22 ft 6 in) and a draft of 4.12 meters (13 ft 6 in). They had an operational diving depth of 90 meters (300 ft) Their crew numbered 55 officers and enlisted men.

For surface running, the boats were powered by two 1,500-brake-horsepower (1,119 kW) diesel engines, each driving one propeller shaft. When submerged each propeller was driven by a 550-horsepower (410 kW) electric motor. They could reach 17 knots (31 km/h; 20 mph) on the surface and 7.7 knots (14.3 km/h; 8.9 mph) underwater. On the surface, the Archimede class had a range of 10,300 nautical miles (19,100 km; 11,900 mi) at 8 knots (15 km/h; 9.2 mph); submerged, they had a range of 105 nmi (194 km; 121 mi) at 3 knots (5.6 km/h; 3.5 mph).

The boats were armed with eight 53.3-centimeter (21 in) torpedo tubes, four each in the bow and in the stern for which they carried a total of 16 torpedoes. They were also armed with a pair of 100 mm (3.9 in) deck guns, one each fore and aft of the conning tower, for combat on the surface. Their anti-aircraft armament consisted of two single 13.2-millimeter (0.52 in) machine guns.

== Construction and career ==
Archimede was laid down by Cantieri navali Tosi di Taranto at their Taranto shipyard in 1931, launched on 10 December 1933 and completed the following year. She was transferred to the Spanish Nationalist Navy in April 1937 and renamed General Sanjurjo.

== Bibliography ==
- Bagnasco, Erminio (1977). Submarines of World War Two. Annapolis, Maryland: Naval Institute Press. ISBN 0-87021-962-6.
- Brescia, Maurizio (2012). Mussolini's Navy: A Reference Guide to the Regina Marina 1930–45. Annapolis, Maryland: Naval Institute Press. ISBN 978-1-59114-544-8.
- Chesneau, Roger, ed. (1980). Conway's All the World's Fighting Ships 1922–1946. London: Conway Maritime Press. ISBN 0-85177-146-7.
- Frank, Willard C. Jr. (1989). "Question 12/88". Warship International. XXVI (1): 95–97. ISSN 0043-0374.
