= Italian submarine Brin =

Italian submarine

History

Italy
- Name: Brin
- Builder: Tosi (Taranto, Italy)
- Laid down: 3 December 1936
- Launched: 3 April 1938
- Commissioned: 18 April 1939
- Stricken: 1 February 1948
- Home port: Taranto
- Fate: Scrapped 1948

General characteristics
- Class & type: Brin-class submarine
- Displacement: 1,016 tons (standard); 1,266 tons (full load)
- Length: 72.5 m (237 ft 10 in)
- Beam: 6.7 m (22 ft 0 in)
- Draught: 4.5 m (14 ft 9 in)
- Propulsion: (surfaced/submerged) diesel / electric, 2 shafts; 3,200 hp (2,400 kW) / 1,200 hp (890 kW)
- Speed: 17 knots (31 km/h; 20 mph) surfaced; 8 knots (15 km/h; 9.2 mph) submerged
- Range: 18,000 nmi (33,000 km; 21,000 mi) at 10 knots (19 km/h; 12 mph)
- Complement: 58
- Armament: 1 × 100 mm (4 in) / 47 caliber gun; 4 × 13.2 mm anti-aircraft; 8 × 21" torpedo tubes (4 bow, 4 stern); 14 torpedoes

Brin was a Brin-class submarine built for and operated by Italy's Regia Marina during World War II.

== History ==
When Italy declared war in June 1940, Brin was the sole vessel in the 42nd Squadron of the Italian submarine fleet.

At the end of 1940, Brin, captained by Luigi Longanesi-Cattani, became one of several Italian submarines that operated in the Atlantic, based in Bordeaux (BETASOM) under German command. In the early hours of 18 December 1940 she was attacked by the British submarine HMS Tuna with torpedoes and gunfire in the Bay of Biscay, about 55 nautical miles (102 km) east of the Gironde estuary. Brin was undamaged and escaped.

On 13 June 1941 she made three torpedo attacks on convoy SL75, succeeding in sinking two ships, the Greek Eirini Kyriakides (3,781 tons) and the British Djurdjura (3,460 tons). She performed five patrols from Bordeaux, sinking over 7,200 tons of allied shipping.

In August 1942 Brin contributed to the Axis opposition to the Pedestal convoy. During the action she brought down an Allied Short Sunderland flying boat. While in the Mediterranean, she performed 17 patrols.

At the Italian armistice, Brin was part of the Italian Fleet that surrendered to the Allies in 1943. She was subsequently used on training operations in the Indian Ocean for the remainder of the war.
