= Settembrini-class submarine =

Italian submarine class

Class overview
- Builders: Cantieri navali Tosi di Taranto, Taranto
- Operators: Regia Marina
- Preceded by: Bragadin class
- Succeeded by: Argo class
- In commission: 1931–1948
- Completed: 2
- Lost: 1
- Scrapped: 1

General characteristics
- Type: Submarine
- Displacement: 953 t (938 long tons) (surfaced); 1,153 t (1,135 long tons) (submerged)
- Length: 69.11 m (226 ft 9 in)
- Beam: 6.61 m (21 ft 8 in)
- Draft: 4.45 m (14 ft 7 in)
- Installed power: 3,000 bhp (2,200 kW) (diesels); 1,400 hp (1,000 kW) (electric motors)
- Propulsion: 2 shafts; diesel-electric; 2 × diesel engines; 2 × electric motors
- Speed: 17.5 knots (32.4 km/h; 20.1 mph) (surfaced); 7.7 knots (14.3 km/h; 8.9 mph) (submerged)
- Range: 6,200 nmi (11,500 km; 7,100 mi) at 7.3 knots (13.5 km/h; 8.4 mph) (surfaced); 100 nmi (190 km; 120 mi) at 3 knots (5.6 km/h; 3.5 mph) (submerged)
- Test depth: 80 m (260 ft)
- Crew: 56
- Armament: 1 × single 102 mm (4 in) deck gun; 2–4 × single 13.2 mm (0.52 in) machine guns; 8 × 533 mm (21 in) torpedo tubes (4 bow, 4 stern)

The Settembrini class was a pair of submarines built for the Regia Marina (Royal Italian Navy) during the late 1920s. They played a minor role in the Spanish Civil War of 1936–1939 supporting the Spanish Nationalists.

== Design and description ==
The Settembrini class was an improved and enlarged version of the preceding Mameli-class submarines. They displaced 953 metric tons (938 long tons) surfaced and 1,153 metric tons (1,135 long tons) submerged. The submarines were 69.11 meters (226 ft 9 in) long, had a beam of 6.61 meters (21 ft 8 in) and a draft of 4.45 meters (14 ft 7 in). They had an operational diving depth of 80 meters (260 ft). Their crew numbered 56 officers and enlisted men.

For surface running, the boats were powered by two 1,500-brake-horsepower (1,119 kW) diesel engines, each driving one propeller shaft. When submerged each propeller was driven by a 700-horsepower (522 kW) electric motor. They could reach 17.5 knots (32.4 km/h; 20.1 mph) on the surface and 7.7 knots (14.3 km/h; 8.9 mph) underwater. On the surface, the Settembrini class had a range of 6,200 nautical miles (11,500 km; 7,100 mi) at 7.3 knots (13.5 km/h; 8.4 mph); submerged, they had a range of 100 nmi (190 km; 120 mi) at 3 knots (5.6 km/h; 3.5 mph).

The boats were armed with eight 53.3-centimeter (21 in) torpedo tubes, four each in the bow and stern for which they carried a total of 12 torpedoes. They were also armed with a single 102-millimeter (4 in) deck gun forward of the conning tower for combat on the surface. Their anti-aircraft armament consisted of two or four 13.2-millimeter (0.52 in) machine guns.

== Boats ==
Construction data
Ship	Builder	Laid down	Launched	Completed	Fate
Luigi Settembrini	Cantiere Navale Triestino, Trieste	16 April 1928	28 September 1930	25 January 1931	Sunk in collision with USS Frament 15 November 1944
Ruggiero Settimo	Cantiere Navale Triestino, Trieste	16 June 1928	29 March 1931	25 April 1932	Stricken from the Navy List 23 March 1947

== Service history ==
During the Spanish Civil War, Luigi Settembrini made one patrol in the Eastern Mediterranean in September 1937 during which she sank a Soviet cargo ship.
