= List of operations in the Mediterranean Sea area during World War II =

This list of World War II military operations is for Mediterranean and Middle Eastern region land operations and operations within the Mediterranean Sea, e.g. naval operations such as Category:Malta convoys.

== Axis ==
- 25 (1941) (Nazi Germany) (Italy) (Hungary) — invasion of Yugoslavia.
  - Strafe ("Punishment") (1941) (Nazi Germany) — Bombing of Belgrade by Luftwaffe as part of Operation 25
- Achse ("Axis") (1943) (Germany) — response to Italian defection. Final plan Achse represented combination of plan Schwartz and original plan Achse.
- Aida (1942) (Germany) (Italy) — Afrika Korps advance into Egypt.
- Little Atlas Agadir (1944) (Germany) —failed operation to fly agents into Morocco
- Bodden (1942) (Germany) (Spain) — German intelligence activity around Gibraltar
- Brandung (1941) (Germany) (Italy) — Axis attack toward El Alamein that became the Battle of Alam el Halfa
- Capri (1942) (Germany) (Italy) — counter-attack at Medenine, Tunisia
- Etappenhase (1944) (Germany) —aborted attempt to establish assault bases along Algerian-Tunisian border
- Felix (1940–41) (Germany) (Spain) — planned invasion of Gibraltar.
- Frühlingswind ("Spring wind") (1943) (Germany) (Italy) — attack on CCA/1st at Sidi bou Zid.
- Gertrud — planned response in event Turkey joined the Allies.
- Herbstnebel 2 (1944) (Germany) — rejected proposal to withdraw troops in Italy behind the Po River.
- Herkules (1942) (Germany) — planned Axis airborne invasion of Malta.
- Isabella (1941) (Germany) — plans for operations on the Iberian Peninsula.
  - Ilana (1942) (Germany) — amended Isabella.
  - Gisella (1942) (Germany) — Isabella renamed.
  - Nürnberg (1943) (Germany) — third and final plan in case of Allied landings in the Iberian Peninsula.
- Lehrgang ("Training Course") (1943) (Germany) — evacuation of Sicily following Allied Operation Husky.
- Marita (1941) (Germany) — invasion of Greece.
  - Alpenveilchen ("Alpine Violet") (Germany) (1941) — planned German intervention in Albania
- Merkur ("Mercury") (1941) (Germany) — German invasion of Crete
- Mittelmeer ("Mediterranean") (1940–1941) (Germany) — reinforcement of Regia Aeronautica in Mediterranean by X Fliegerkorps
- Morgenluft ("Morning Air") (1941) (Germany) — occupation of Gafsa
- Morgenrote ("Dawn") (1944) (Germany) — German counterattack against Allied Operation Shingle.
- Moro (1941) (Germany) — refuelling of U-boats by Spain
- Ochsenkopf ("Ox head") (1942) (Germany) —
- Otto (1943) (Germany) (Independent State of Croatia) — anti-Partisan operation
- Skorpion ("Scorpion") (1941) (Germany) (Italy) — Axis recapture of Halfaya Pass
- Sommernachtstraum ("Summers Night Dream") (1941) (Germany) (Italy) —
- Sonnenblume (Sun Flower) (Germany) — movement Afrika Korps troops to North Africa as a result of Compass
- Sturmflut ("Storm tide") (1941) (Germany) —
- Theseus (1942) (Germany) (Italy) — offensive to drive Allies out of Cyrenaica and Egypt
- Wintergewitter ("Winter Storm") (1944) (Germany) (Italy) — axis offensive against the American 92nd Infantry Division in the Apennines
- Venezia (1941) (Germany) (Italy) — axis attack on the Gazala Line

== Allies ==
- Abstention (1941) (United Kingdom) — British attempt to seize the island of Kastelorizo thwarted by Italian forces
- Acrobat (1942) (United Kingdom) — British proposal to attack Tripoli
- Abeam (1941) (United Kingdom) — disinformation operation to convince Italians of the presence of British paratroops in north Africa
- Accolade (1943) (United Kingdom) (South Africa) — proposed British occupation of Rhodes, and subsequently, failed occupation of the Dodecanese
- Agreement (1942) (United Kingdom) (Southern Rhodesia) — British, Rhodesian and New Zealand raids on several North African targets
  - Daffodil (1942) (United Kingdom) — Tobruk raid
  - Hyacinth (1942) (United Kingdom) — Barce raid
  - Snowdrop (1942) (United Kingdom) — Benghazi raid
  - Tulip (1942) (United Kingdom) — Jalo oasis recapture
- Anvil (1944) (United States) (United Kingdom) (Free France) — Allied invasion of Southern France. Name later changed to Dragoon
- Astrologer (1941) (United Kingdom) — failed attempt to run 2 unescorted transports to Malta
- Avalanche (1943) (United States) (United Kingdom) — Allied landings near Salerno, Italy
  - Boardman (1943) — deception operation for Avalanche
  - Giant II (United States) — cancelled landing of U.S. 82nd Airborne near Rome.
- Battleaxe (1941) (United Kingdom) (British Raj) — failed British attack on Axis forces in North Africa to relieve Tobruk
- Backbone & Backbone II (1942 & 1943) (United Kingdom) — contingency plans to occupy Spanish Morocco and area around Gibraltar if Germans entered Spain
  - Ballast (?) (United Kingdom) — plan to support Gibraltar
  - Blackthorn (?) (United Kingdom) — plan to support Gibraltar
  - Challenger (?) (United Kingdom) — plan to seize Ceuta
- Baritone (1942) (United Kingdom) — delivery of 32 Spitfires to Malta from HMS Furious
- Baytown (1943) (United Kingdom) — Allied landings in Calabria, Italy
  - Slapstick (1943) (United Kingdom) — British landings at Taranto
- Begonia (1943) (United Kingdom) — airborne part of attempted British POW rescue in Italy
- Bellows (1942) (United Kingdom) — delivery of 38 Spitfires to Malta from HMS Furious
- Bowery (1942) (United Kingdom) (United States) — delivery of 64 Spitfires to Malta from HMS Eagle and USS Wasp
- Brasso (1942) (United Kingdom) — scheme for safe unloading and dispersal of ships' cargo at Malta
- Brevity (1941) (United Kingdom) — British capture of Halfaya Pass, Egypt
- Buffalo (1944) (United States) — breakout from the Anzio beachhead
- Calendar (1942) (United Kingdom) (United States) — delivery of 47 Spitfires to Malta from USS Wasp
- Callboy (1941) (United Kingdom) — delivery of Swordfish and Albacores to Malta from HMS Argus
- Candytuft (1943) (United Kingdom) — SAS operation to destroy rail bridge between Pesaro and Fano
- Canuck (1945) (United Kingdom) — SAS operation to disrupt enemy communications in north-west Italy
- Chaucer (1944) (Belgium) — SAS operation to disrupt enemy communications in north-west Italy
- Chesterfield (1944) (Canada) (United Kingdom) — assault on Hitler Line
- Coat (1940) (United Kingdom) — passage of naval reinforcements through the Mediterranean
- Cold Comfort (1945) (United Kingdom) — failed SAS raid to block rail route through Brenner Pass
- Collar (1940) (United Kingdom) — naval reinforcements from Gibraltar to Egypt, carrying supplies and personnel for Malta and Egypt.
- Colossus (1941) (United Kingdom) — experimental airborne raid on Italian aqueduct near Calitri in southern Italy
- Compass (1940) (United Kingdom) — British counteroffensive in North Africa
- Corkscrew (1943) (United Kingdom) — Allied occupation of Pantellaria
- Crusader (1941) (United Kingdom) (New Zealand) — British relief of Tobruk
  - Chieftain (1941) (United Kingdom) — attempt to divert German aircraft with a decoy convoy from Gibraltar
  - Landmark (1941) (United Kingdom) — diversion with a non-existent convoy to Malta
- Crupper (1942) (United Kingdom) — failed attempt to run two unescorted freighters into Malta
- Demon (1941) (United Kingdom) — evacuation of Allied troops from Greece
- Devon (1943) (United Kingdom) — Special Raiding Squadron attack on Termoli
- Diadem (1944) (United States) (United Kingdom) (Free France) — successful Allied assault on German Gustav Line defences in Italy.
  - Strangle (1944) (United States) — Allied bombing of German supply lines, in preparation for operation Diadem.
- Dragoon (1944) (United States) (United Kingdom) (Free France) — Allied landing in southern France
  - Dove (United States) (United Kingdom) — gliderborne component of Dragoon
  - Romeo (Free France) — Free French assault on German coastal battery
  - Rosie (Free France) — Free French commando raid near Théoule-sur-Mer
  - Rugby (United States) (United Kingdom) — Airborne portion of Dragoon
  - Sitka (United States) (Canada) — 1st Special Services Force assault on Îles d'Hyères
  - Span — deception operation in support of Dragoon
- Dunlop (1941) (United Kingdom) — delivery of 24 Hurricanes to Malta from HMS Ark Royal (1 lost en route)
- Encore (1945) — Allied assault on mountain positions in Italy
- Excess (1941) (United Kingdom) — Malta convoy to reinforce Greece and Malta
  - MC4 (1941) (United Kingdom) — shipping movements to and from Malta
- Exporter (1941) (United Kingdom) (Free France) — Allied invasion of Vichy-controlled Syria and Lebanon
- Fustian (1943) (United Kingdom) — British airborne capture of a bridge on Sicily
- Galia (1944) (United Kingdom) — British SAS operation in northwestern Italy in support of the US 5th Army
- Grog (1941) (United Kingdom) — bombardment of Genoa
- Guillotine (1941) (United Kingdom) — transfer of troops to Cyprus
- Guillotine (1943) (United Kingdom) — Allied advance from Cyrenaica to Tripolitania
- Gymnast — early name for Operation Torch
- Halberd (1941) (United Kingdom) — Malta convoy via Gibraltar
- Hawthorn (1943) — Special Boat Service raid on Sardinia
- Hats (1940) (United Kingdom) — attempt to provoke Italians into a fleet action and supplies for Malta and Egypt from Gibraltar
  - Squawk (1940) (United Kingdom) — radio transmissions by destroyers, intended to mislead or confuse Italians
- Hide (1940) (United Kingdom) — movements by Force H to cover convoy and escort HMS Malaya to Gibraltar (linked to Operation MC2)
  - Seek (1940) (United Kingdom) — anti-submarine sweep ahead of Hide
- Hurry (1940) (United Kingdom) — delivery of 12 Hurricanes to Malta from HMS Argus
  - Spark (1940) (United Kingdom) — diversionary radio transmissions by HMS Enterprise
- Husky (United States) (United Kingdom) (1943) — Allied invasion of Sicily
  - Chestnut (1943) (United Kingdom) — failed SAS operation to disrupt enemy communications in northern Sicily
  - Ladbroke (1943) (United Kingdom) — British glider landing near Syracuse, Sicily
  - Mincemeat (1943) (United Kingdom) — disinformation operation prior to the invasion of Sicily
    - Brimstone (1943) (United Kingdom) — fictional invasion of Sardinia, part of cover for Husky
  - Narcissus (1943) (United Kingdom) — British SAS raid on a lighthouse in Sicily
- Insect (1942) (United Kingdom) — delivery of 28 Spitfires from HMS Eagle
- Jonquil (1943) (United Kingdom) — seaborne part of attempted British POW rescue in Italy (see also: Begonia)
- Judgement (1940) (United Kingdom) — British air attack on Italian fleet in Taranto harbour
- Julius (1942) (United Kingdom) — coordinated supply convoys to Malta
  - Harpoon (1942) (United Kingdom) — Malta convoy from Gibraltar
  - Salient (1942) (United Kingdom) — delivery of Spitfires to Malta from HMS Eagle
  - Style (1942) (United Kingdom) — delivery of Spitfires to Malta from HMS Eagle
  - Vigorous (1942) (United Kingdom) — Malta convoy from Alexandria
    - Rembrandt (1942) (United Kingdom) — Malta convoy from Alexandria, early portion of Vigorous
- LB (1942) (United Kingdom) — delivery of 16 Spitfires to Malta from HMS Eagle
- Lightfoot (1942) (United Kingdom) (Australia) — first attack by the British and Australians at El Alamein
  - Bertram (1942) — deception operation in preparation for the Second Battle of El Alamein
  - Supercharge (1942) (United Kingdom) (New Zealand) — second stage attack by British and New Zealanders at El Alamein
- Lustre (1941) (United Kingdom) (Australia) (New Zealand) (Poland) — Allied reinforcement of Greece
- Mandibles (1941) (United Kingdom) (Australia) — a planned 1940-1941 British amphibious assault on Rhodes, Leros and the Dodecanese Islands in the Aegean Sea.
- Manna (1944) (United Kingdom) — Allied re-occupation of Greece and Aegean Islands
- Marigold (1943) (United Kingdom) — unsuccessful SAS/SBS mission to snatch a prisoner from Sardinia
- MB8 (1940) (United Kingdom) (Australia) — passage of convoys from Alexandria to Malta and from Port Said to Crete
  - Barbarity (1940) (United Kingdom) — carriage of military personnel and equipment by cruiser to Suda Bay
- MC2 (1940) (United Kingdom) — passage westwards of HMS Malaya (linked to Operation Hide)
- Outing & Outing II (1944) (United Kingdom) — anti-shipping operations in Aegean Sea
- Pedestal (1942) (United Kingdom) — Allied convoy from Gibraltar to Malta.
  - Ascendant (1942) (United Kingdom) — escort of freighters from Malta
  - Bellows (1942) (United Kingdom) — delivery of Spitfires to Malta from HMS Furious
  - Berserk (1942) (United Kingdom) — exercise to establish fleet air tactics
  - Ceres (1942) (United Kingdom) — scheme for safe unloading and dispersal of Pedestal cargoes at Malta
- Perpetual (1941) — delivery of aircraft to Malta
- Picket (1942) (United Kingdom) — delivery of 16 Spitfires to Malta from HMS Eagle and Argus
- Pilgrim (1941) (United Kingdom) — contingency plan to seize Canary Islands
- Pinpoint (1942) (United Kingdom) — delivery run to Malta by HMS Welshman
- Propeller (1941) (United Kingdom) — passage of Empire Guillemot to Malta
- Portcullis (1942) (United Kingdom) — convoy from Alexandria to Malta
- Pugilist (1943) (United Kingdom) (New Zealand) (British Raj) — Allied attack on Mareth Line and advance to Sfax
- Puma (1941) (United Kingdom) — contingency plan to seize Canary Islands
- Quadrangle (1942) (United Kingdom) — three convoy movements to and from Malta
- Railway (1941) (United Kingdom) — delivery of Hurricanes to Malta from HMS Furious and HMS Ark Royal in 2 phases
- Rocket (1941) (United Kingdom) — delivery of Hurricanes to Malta from HMS Furious and HMS Ark Royal
- Roast (1945) (United Kingdom) — action by British Commandos at Comacchio lagoon, north east Italy
- Sapphic (?) (United Kingdom) — plan to support Gibraltar
- Salient (1941) (United Kingdom) — delivery of 32 Spitfires to Malta from HMS Eagle
- Saxifrage (1943) — four parties from 2 SAS to destroy the railway line between Ancona and Pescara
- Shingle (1944) (United States) (United Kingdom) — Allied landings at Anzio
  - Chettyford — deception plan to support Shingle
  - Maple (1944) (United Kingdom) — several SAS operations to cut railways in Italy in support of Anzio landings
    - Baobab (1945) (United Kingdom) — SAS operation to destroy rail bridge between Pesaro and Fano
    - Driftwood (1944) (United Kingdom) — failed raid on rail targets
    - Thistledown (1944) (United Kingdom) — raid on rail targets near Terni and Orvieto
  - Pomegranate (1944) — SAS raid in support of Shingle
- Speedwell (1945) (United Kingdom) — Behind enemy lines operation by the British Special Air Service to disrupt rail communications in northern Italy.
- Splice (1941) (United Kingdom) — delivery of Hurricanes to Malta from HMS Furious and HMS Ark Royal
- Spotter (1942) (United Kingdom) — delivery of 15 Spitfires to Malta from HMS Eagle and Argus
- Status 1 (1941) (United Kingdom) — delivery of 26 Hurricanes and a Swordfish to Malta from HMS Ark Royal
- Status 2 (1941) (United Kingdom) — delivery of Hurricanes and a Swordfish to Malta from HMS Ark Royal and Furious
- Stone Age (or: Stoneage) (1942) (United Kingdom) — Malta convoy from Alexandria
- Substance (1941) (United Kingdom) — Malta convoy
- Sunrise (1945) — negotiations leading to German surrender in Italy
- Supercharge II (1942) (United Kingdom) (New Zealand) — breakthrough at Tebaga Gap, Tunisia
- Survey (1943) (United Kingdom) — Malta convoy from Alexandria
- Temple (1941) (United Kingdom) — failed attempt to run a merchant ship (Parracombe) to Malta
- Tiger (1941) (United Kingdom) — Malta convoy via Gibraltar
- Tombola (1945) (United Kingdom) — SAS raid in Italy
- Torch (1942) (United States) (United Kingdom) — Allied landings in Morocco and Algeria originally titled Gymnast
  - Blackstone (1942) (United States) — US assault on Safi, Morocco
  - Brushwood (1942) (United States) — US assault on Fedala
  - Goalpost (1942) (United States) — US assault on Port Lyautey (now Kenitra)
  - Perpetual (1942) (United Kingdom) — British landings at Cap Carbon
  - Reservist (1942) (United States) (United Kingdom) — failed Allied attack on Oran
- Tracer (1941) (United Kingdom) — delivery of 48 Hurricanes to Malta from HMS Ark Royal and Victorious
- Train (1942) (United Kingdom) — delivery of 29 Spitfires to Malta from Furious
- Vesuve (1943) (Free France) — Free French landings in Corsica
- Vulcan (1943) (United States) (United Kingdom) (Free France) — final Allied assault on Axis forces trapped around Tunis
- White (1940) (United Kingdom) — delivery of 12 Hurricanes to Malta (4 arrive, 8 lost en route)
- Winch (1940) (United Kingdom) — delivery of 12 Hurricanes to Malta from HMS Ark Royal
- Wop (1943) (United States) — US 1st Division occupies Gafsa
- Zombie (1945) — Operation Cold Comfort, renamed
