= Sholto Douglas, 1st Baron Douglas of Kirtleside =

British Marshal of the Royal Air Force (1893–1969)

Marshal of the Royal Air Force The Right Honourable The Lord Douglas of Kirtleside GCB MC DFC
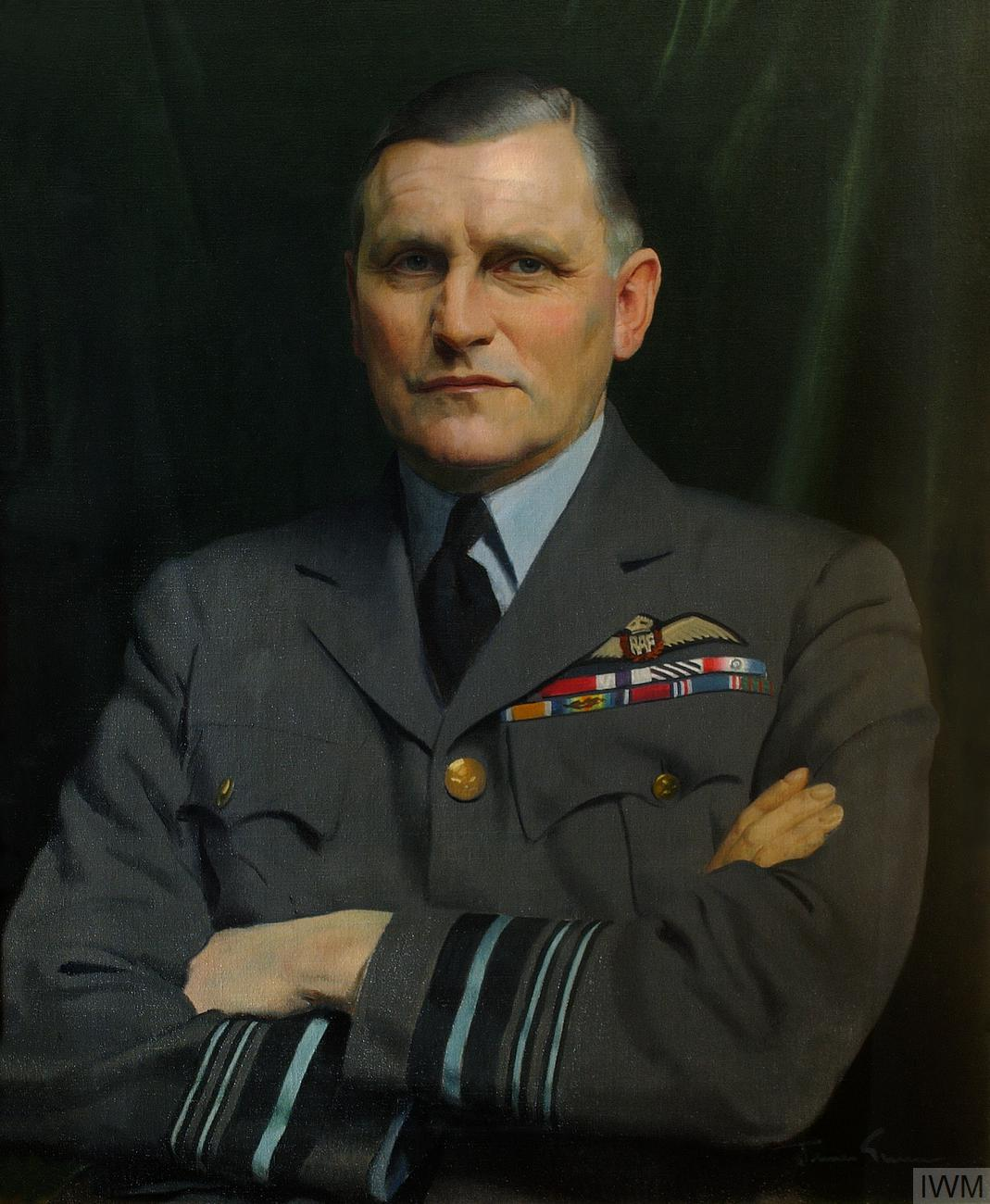
- Born: 23 December 1893; Headington, England
- Died: 29 October 1969 (aged 75); Northampton, England
- Burial place: St Clement Danes, London
- Military career
- Allegiance: United Kingdom
- Branch: British Army (1914–1918); Royal Air Force (1918–1947)
- Service years: 1914–1947
- Rank: Marshal of the Royal Air Force
- Commands: British Zone of Occupation (1946–1947); British Air Forces of Occupation (1945–1946); Coastal Command (1944–1945); RAF Middle East Command (1943–1944); Fighter Command (1940–1942); RAF North Weald (1928–1929); No. 84 Squadron (1917–1918); No. 43 Squadron (1916–1917)
- Conflicts: First World War; Second World War
- Awards: Knight Grand Cross of the Order of the Bath; Military Cross; Distinguished Flying Cross; Mentioned in Despatches (3); Croix de guerre (France); Commander's Cross with Star of the Order of Polonia Restituta (Poland); Order of the White Lion (Czechoslovakia); Grand Officer's Cross with Swords of the Order of the White Eagle (Yugoslavia); Chief Commander of the Legion of Merit (United States); Grand Cross of the Order of St Olav (Norway); Grand Cross of the Order of the Phoenix (Greece); Knight Grand Cross of the Order of Orange Nassau (Netherlands); Grand Officer of the Order of the Crown (Belgium)

Marshal of the Royal Air Force William Sholto Douglas, 1st Baron Douglas of Kirtleside (23 December 1893 – 29 October 1969) was a senior commander in the Royal Air Force. After serving as a pilot, then a flight commander and finally as a squadron commander during the First World War, he served as a flying instructor during the inter-war years before becoming Director of Staff Duties and then Assistant Chief of the Air Staff at the Air Ministry.

During the Second World War Douglas clashed with other senior commanders over strategy in the Battle of Britain. Douglas supported Air Chief Marshal Trafford Leigh-Mallory who argued for a 'Big Wing' strategy i.e. using massed fighters to defend the United Kingdom against enemy bombers.

After the Battle of Britain, Douglas became Air Officer Commanding-in-Chief of Fighter Command in which role he was responsible for rebuilding the command's strength after the attrition of the Battle of Britain, but also for bringing it on the offensive to wrest the initiative in the air from the German Luftwaffe.

Douglas went on to be Air Officer Commanding in Chief of RAF Middle East Command in which role he was an advocate of Operation Accolade, a planned British amphibious assault on Rhodes and the Dodecanese Islands in the Aegean Sea, and was disappointed when it was abandoned. He became commander of the British Zone of Occupation in Germany after the war.

From 1949 to 1964 he served as chairman of British European Airways.

== Early life ==
Born the son of Robert Langton Douglas and his wife Margaret Jane Douglas (née Cannon), Douglas was educated at Emanuel School, Tonbridge School and Lincoln College, Oxford.

== Early military career ==
Douglas was commissioned as a second lieutenant in the Royal Field Artillery on 15 August 1914. In January 1915, following a disagreement with his commanding officer, he transferred to the Royal Flying Corps joining No. 2 Squadron as an observer. He soon trained as a pilot and earned Royal Aero Club certificate No 1301. Promoted to lieutenant on 9 June 1915, he became a pilot with No. 14 Squadron at Shoreham in July 1915 and then transferred to No. 8 Squadron, flying B.E.2c aircraft on the Western Front, in August 1915. Appointed a flight commander with the rank of temporary captain in December 1915, he joined No. 18 Squadron at Montrose in January 1916. He was awarded the Military Cross on 14 January 1916.

Douglas went on to be officer commanding No. 43 Squadron, flying Sopwith 1½ Strutters on the Western Front, in April 1916 and, having been promoted to temporary major on 1 July 1916, he became then officer commanding No. 84 Squadron, flying S.E.5s on the Western Front, in August 1917. He was awarded the Distinguished Flying Cross on 8 February 1919.

After the war Douglas worked briefly for Handley Page and as a commercial pilot before rejoining the Royal Air Force in 1920 after a chance meeting with Hugh Trenchard. After being granted a permanent commission as a squadron leader on 25 March 1920, Douglas attended the RAF Staff College and then served as a flight instructor for four years. Promoted to wing commander on 1 January 1925, he continued his work as an instructor before attending the Imperial Defence College in 1927. He became station commander at RAF North Weald in January 1928 and then joined the Air Staff at Headquarters Middle East Command in Khartoum in August 1929. Promoted to group captain on 1 January 1932, he became an instructor at the Imperial Defence College in June 1932 and then, having been promoted to air commodore on 1 January 1935, he became Director of Staff Duties at the Air Ministry on 1 January 1936. Promoted to air vice marshal on 1 January 1938, he went on to be Assistant Chief of the Air Staff on 17 February 1938.

== Second World War ==
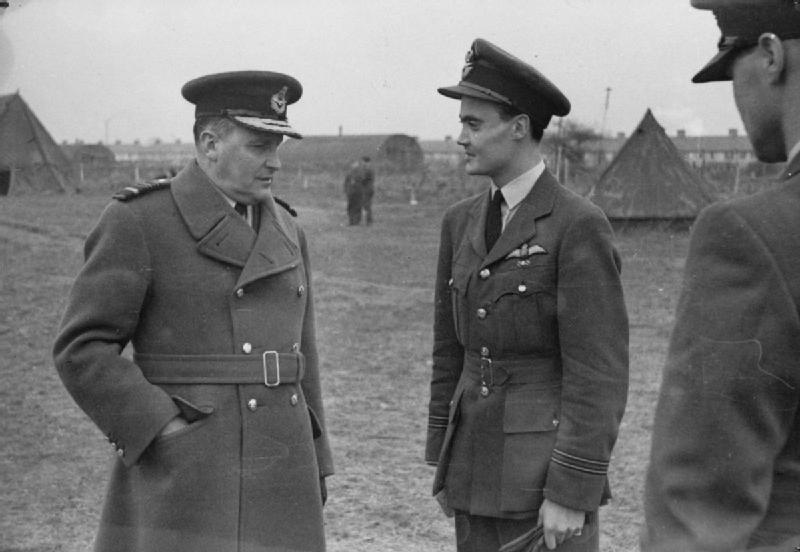
Air Marshal Sir William Sholto Douglas, Commander-in-Chief Fighter Command (left) during a visit to No 61 OTU at Heston, November 1941

On 22 April 1940, with the Second World War well under way, he was made Deputy Chief of the Air Staff. He was appointed a Companion of the Order of the Bath on 11 July 1940.

During 1940, Trafford Leigh-Mallory clashed with the head of No. 11 Group, Keith Park, and the head of Fighter Command, Hugh Dowding, over strategy in the Battle of Britain. Leigh-Mallory argued for a 'Big Wing' strategy i.e. using massed fighters to defend the United Kingdom against enemy bombers.

However, the commander of the Kent area, AVM Keith Park, pointed out that while "big wings" were forming (which took some time), his fighter bases in places like Kent were being bombed because they were close to Luftwaffe bases in northern France and there was not time to form "big wings" before enemy bombs were released on Park's airfields.

After the Battle of Britain when Charles Portal was made Chief of the Air Staff in October 1940, Dowding retired and Portal moved Park and appointing Douglas to replace Dowding as Air Officer Commanding-in-Chief of Fighter Command, with the temporary rank of air marshal on 25 November 1940. He was advanced to Knight Commander of the Order of the Bath on 1 July 1941 and promoted to the substantive rank of air marshal on 14 April 1942.

At around this time Prime Minister Winston Churchill recommended Douglas to command the China Burma India Theater but General George C. Marshall, the U.S. Army Chief of Staff, refused to accept the appointment due to Douglas's well known dislike of Americans.

As commander-in-chief of Fighter Command, Douglas was responsible for rebuilding the command's strength after the attrition of the Battle of Britain, but also for bringing it on the offensive to wrest the initiative in the air from the German Luftwaffe. He was therefore one of the main orchestrators of the only partially successful Circus offensive whereby large wings of fighters accompanied by bombers would take advantage of good weather to sweep over Northern France.

Douglas was promoted to temporary air chief marshal on 1 July 1942. On 28 November 1942 Douglas was replaced at Fighter Command by Trafford Leigh-Mallory and was transferred to Egypt, becoming Air Officer Commanding in Chief of RAF Middle East Command in January 1943. In that capacity Douglas was an advocate of Operation Accolade, a planned British amphibious assault on Rhodes and the Dodecanese Islands in the Aegean Sea, and was disappointed when it was abandoned.

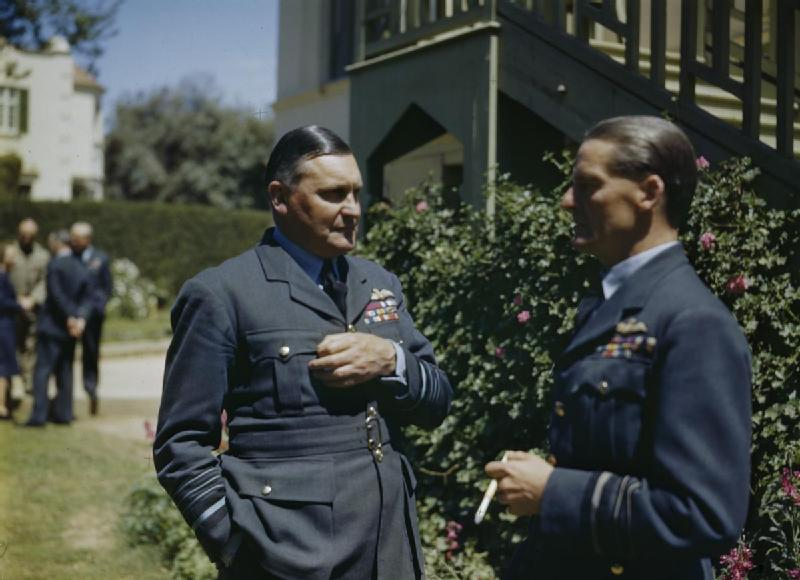
Air Chief Marshal Sir William Sholto Douglas, Air Officer Commanding-in-Chief, RAF Middle East Command (left) with Air Officer Commanding Malta, Air Marshal Sir Keith Park in the garden at HQ, Malta

Douglas returned to England in January 1944 to head Coastal Command during the invasion of Normandy and then, having been confirmed in the rank of air chief marshal on 6 June 1945, he became Commander in Chief, British Air Forces of Occupation in July 1945. He was advanced to Knight Grand Cross of the Order of the Bath on 1 January 1946.

Promoted to Marshal of the Royal Air Force on 1 January 1946, Douglas became the second commander of the British Zone of Occupation in Germany in May 1946. He was raised to the peerage as Baron Douglas of Kirtleside, of Dornock in the County of Dumfries on 17 February 1948, sitting as a member of the Labour Party. Douglas retired in 1947 and became chairman of BEA in 1949, a post he retained until 1964. He published two volumes of autobiography, Years of Combat, covering the First World War, and Years of Command covering the Second World War.

Douglas died in hospital in Northampton on 29 October 1969 and was buried at St Clement Danes in The Strand in London.

== Family ==
Lord Douglas of Kirtleside was married three times. First he married Beatrice May Hudd on 1 August 1919 at The Registry Office in Croydon, Surrey; they were childless and divorced in 1932. Secondly he married Joan Leslie (née Denny) in 1933; this marriage was also childless and ended in divorce in 1952. Thirdly he married Hazel Walker in 1955; they had one daughter.

Douglas' daughter Dr Katherine Campbell, a neuroscientist, wrote a biography of her father's life, Behold the Dark Gray Man, and came to the conclusion her father had experienced post-traumatic stress disorder as a result of his experiences.

== Arms ==
Coat of arms of Sholto Douglas, 1st Baron Douglas of Kirtleside
Crest A heart Gules imperially crowned Proper between two wings displayed Or. Escutcheon Quarterly 1st & 4th Argent a heart Gules imperially crowned Proper on a chief Azure three mullets of the first (Douglas), 2nd & 3rd Azure a bend between six cross crosslets fitchée Or (Mar), all within a bordure engrailed Gules on a canton sinister Sable an eagle displayed Or. Supporters Two horses Azure winged crined and hooved Or. Motto Forward And Aloft (above), Jamais Arrière (below)

== Publications ==
- W.S.D. (1930). "Air combat". Encyclopaedia Britannica. Vol. 1 (14 ed.). pp. 440–444.
- Douglas, Sholto, Baron Douglas of Kirtleside (1963). Years of Combat: the first volume of the autobiography of Sholto Douglas, Marshal of the Royal Air Force, Lord Douglas of Kirtleside. GCB, MC, DFC. Collins.
- Douglas, Sholto, Baron Douglas of Kirtleside (1966). Years of Command: the second volume of the autobiography of Sholto Douglas, Marshal of the Royal Air Force, Lord Douglas of Kirtleside. GCB, MC, DFC. Collins.

== Sources ==
- Claasen, Adam (2012). Dogfight: The Battle of Britain. Anzac Battle Series. Auckland: Exisle Publishing. ISBN 978-1-921497-28-5.
- Orange (6 January 2011). "Sholto Douglas, 1st Baron Douglas of Kirtleside". Oxford Dictionary of National Biography (online ed.). Oxford University Press. doi:10.1093/ref:odnb/32876. (Subscription, Wikipedia Library access or UK public library membership required.)
- Pogue, Forrest (1973). George C. Marshall, Vol. 3: Organizer of Victory, 1943–1945. Viking Press. ISBN 978-0670336944.

Military offices
Preceded by Richard Peirse	Deputy Chief of the Air Staff; April–November 1940	Succeeded by Arthur Harris
Preceded by Sir Hugh Dowding	Commander-in-Chief Fighter Command; 1940–1942	Succeeded by Sir Trafford Leigh-Mallory
Preceded by Sir Arthur Tedder	Commander-in-Chief Middle East Command; 1943–1944	Succeeded by Sir Keith Park
Preceded by Sir John Slessor	Commander-in-Chief Coastal Command; 1944–1945	Succeeded by Sir Leonard Slatter
Preceded by Sir Arthur Coningham (As C-in-C Second Tactical Air Force)	Commander-in-Chief; 1945–1946	Succeeded by Sir Philip Wigglesworth
Peerage of the United Kingdom
New creation	Baron Douglas of Kirtleside; 1948–1969	Extinct
