= Operation Mandibles =

During World War II, Operation Mandibles was a planned 1940/1941 British amphibious assault on Rhodes, Leros and the Dodecanese Islands in the Aegean Sea. Planned by Roger Keyes of the Special Operation branch, it was never executed." A disastrous invasion of the islands, the Dodecanese campaign, was conducted in 1943.

== See also ==
- Operation Abstention
- Operation Accolade
- Operation Hercules
- List of naval and land-based operations in Mediterranean Sea area during World War II
