= Operation White =

1940 British attempt to resupply Malta in WWII

- Part of the Battle of the Mediterranean of the Second World War
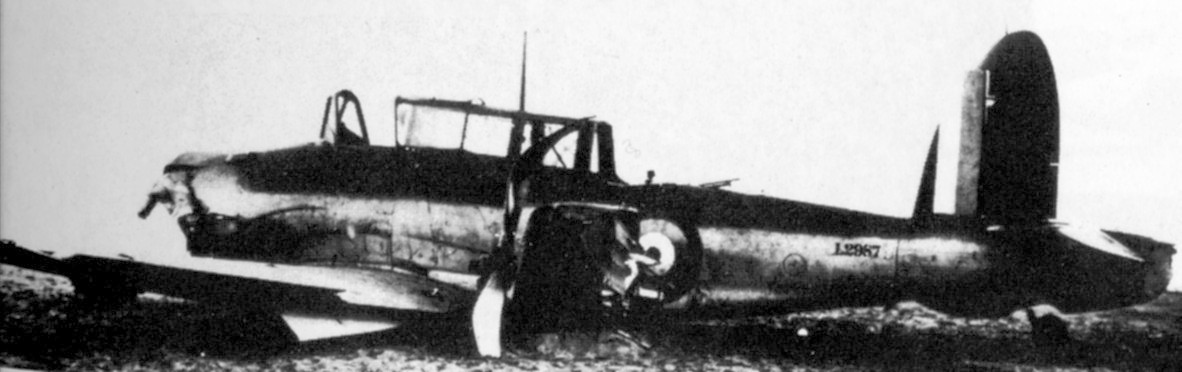
- Skua L2987 after the crash-landing on Sicily
| Date | 15–18 November 1940 |
| Location | Strait of Sicily, Mediterranean Sea 37°12′00″N 11°20′00″E |
| Result | Italian victory |

Belligerents
| United Kingdom | Italy |

Commanders and leaders
| James Somerville | Inigo Campioni |

Strength
| 2 aircraft carriers; 1 battlecruiser; 2 cruisers; 7 destroyers | 2 battleships; 2 heavy cruisers; 16 destroyers |

Casualties and losses
| 9 aircraft lost; 7 pilots missing; 2 (POW) | None |

Operation White (15–18 November 1940) was a British attempt to deliver fourteen aircraft, twelve Hurricane Mk II fighters and two Skua fighter–dive bombers, to Malta from the aircraft carrier HMS Argus. White was one of what became known as Club Runs, that supplied fighters for the defence of Malta.

The operation was thwarted by the presence of the Italian fleet, which prompted the premature dispatch of the fighters; combined with bad weather and some poor navigation, this led to only five aircraft reaching Malta, all but one the other pilots and aircraft being lost at sea.

An enquiry blamed the Hurricane pilots for lack of familiarity with the constant-speed propeller on the Hurricane Mk II. Few people were convinced and Vice-Admiral Sir James Somerville, the commander of Force H at Gibraltar, confided in his diary that the operation was "a frightful failure" and blamed himself for the tragedy.

== Background ==
=== Malta ===
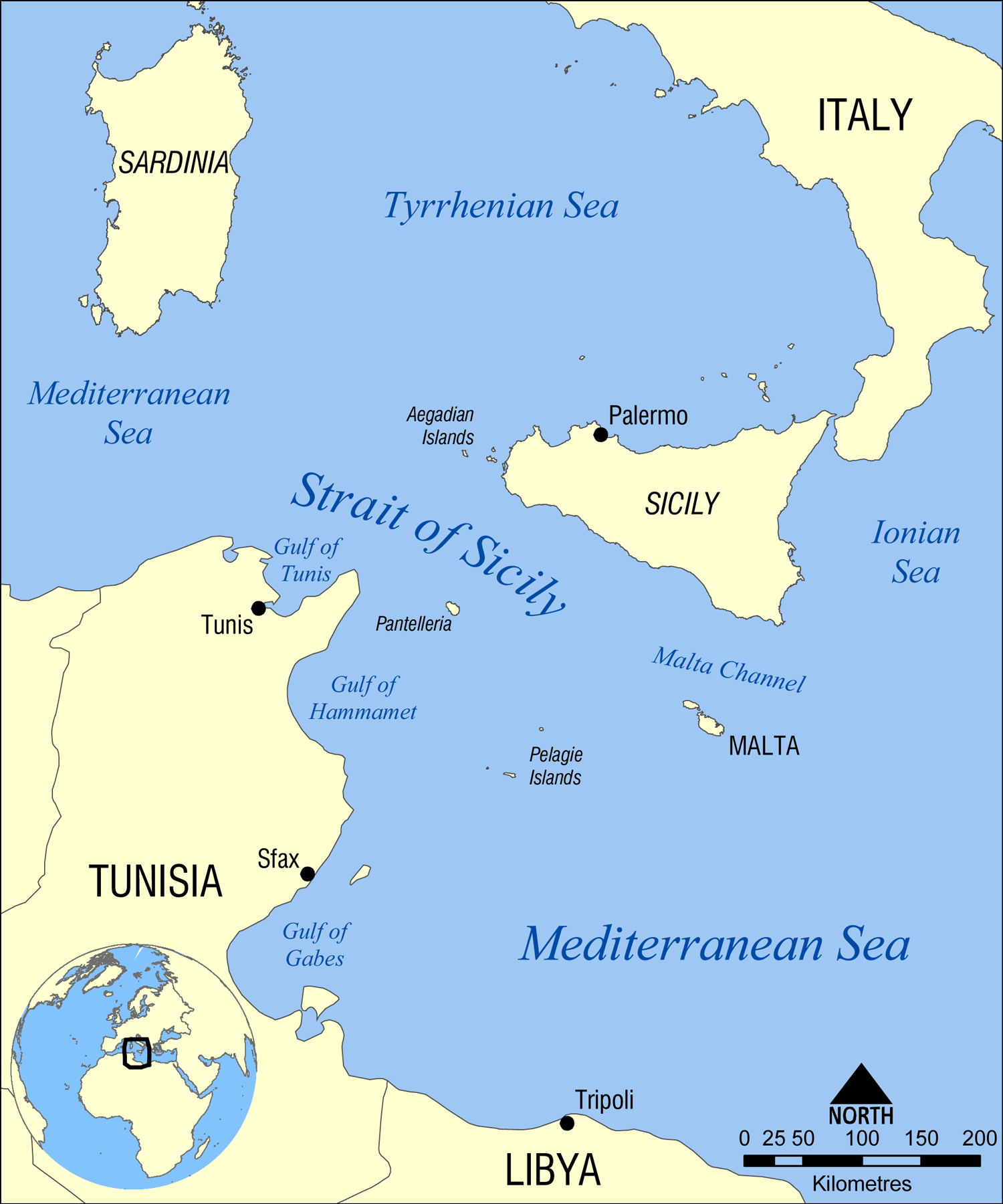
Map of the Strait of Sicily, showing Malta

After the entry of Italy in the Second World War on 10 June 1940, the division of responsibility in the Mediterranean between the French Navy (Marine Nationale) in the west and the British in the eastern Mediterranean ended. To compensate for the withdrawal of the French, the Admiralty established Force H at Gibraltar. The British authorities designed a formal system of aircraft reinforcement to Malta, to assemble an adequate air defence and replace potential losses. Only two routes remained open after the Battle of France, via North Africa, by shuttling the fighters over the Sahara or via the Suez Canal to Egypt and by delivering them by aircraft carrier from the western Mediterranean.

=== Operation Hurry ===
Force H (Admiral Sir James Somerville), comprised the fleet carrier HMS Ark Royal with the Fleet Air Arm (FAA) 808 Naval Air Squadron [NAS] (Fulmar), 800 NAS (Skua), 810 NAS, 818 NAS and 820 NAS (Swordfish). The battleships HMS Valiant and Resolution, the cruisers HMS Arethusa, Delhi and Enterprise and the destroyers HMS Faulknor, Forester, Foresight, Foxhound, Fearless, Escapade, Active and Wrestler. On 2 August, nine Fairey Swordfish aircraft took off from Ark Royal to bomb Cagliari and three to lay mines. The first party to conduct a Club Run was 418 Flight Royal Air Force (RAF), comprising RAF pilots transferred from their squadrons and other pilots who had been attached to the FAA and trained for deck operations. On 2 August 1940, the aircraft took off from HMS Argus south-west of Sardinia, sailing independently of Force H, with a destroyer escort comprising HMS Encounter, Gallant, Greyhound and Hotspur.

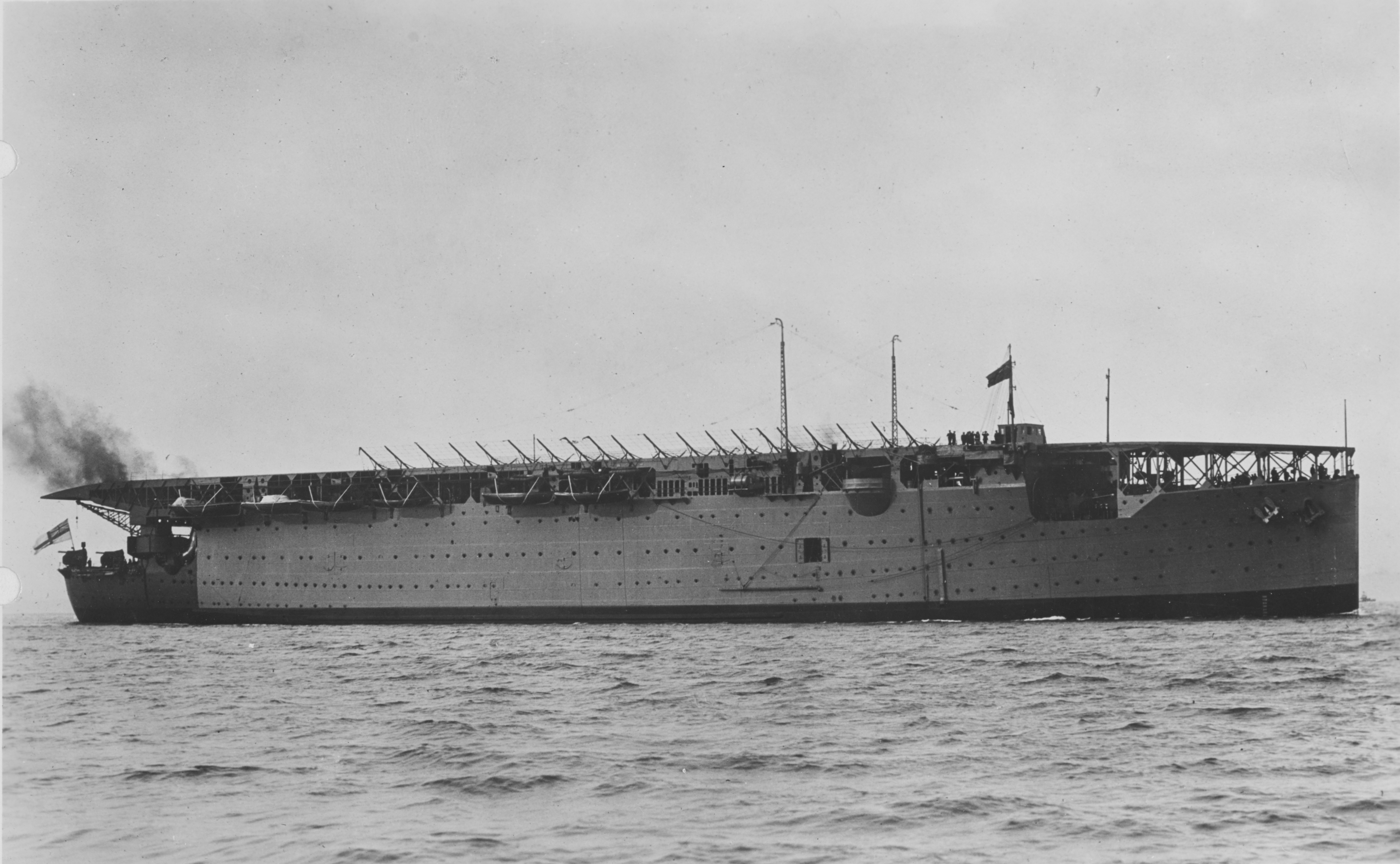
HMS Argus

When the Italian naval headquarters (Supermarina) discovered the sailing of Force H, two lines of submarines, Scirè, Argo, Neghelli, Turchese, Medusa, Axum, Diaspro and Luciano Manara were assembled on 1 August to the north of Cap Bougaroûn but the move proved abortive, with no sightings by 9 August. Three Regia Aeronautica (Italian Royal Air force) Savoia-Marchetti SM.79 medium bombers attacked Force H but Skuas from Ark Royal shot down one of the SM.79s and drove off the other two. The British fighters reached the airstrip at Luqa at Malta but two of the aeroplanes crash-landed. The first engagement of the new aircraft took place on the night of 13/14 August, when they shot down another SM.79. By 16 August, 418 Flight and the original Malta units were amalgamated into 261 Squadron.

== Prelude ==
=== Force H ===
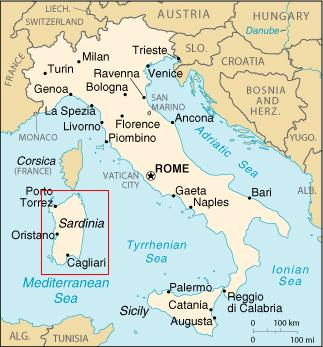
Map of Sardinia showing Cagliari

Following the success of Hurry, another mission was planned for November. The aircraft were to be delivered by Argus again, escorted by Force H from Gibraltar, with the battlecruiser HMS Renown, the carrier Ark Royal, the cruisers HMS Despatch and Sheffield and the destroyers Faulknor, Fortune, Fury, Wishart, Forester, Firedrake, Duncan and Foxhound. The convoy departed Gibraltar at dawn on 15 November. Earlier that day, a report was passed to Somerville that the Italian fleet was at sea south of Naples, to confront Force H. He decided to launch the fighters as soon as possible.

=== Regia Marina ===
Supermarina, the Italian naval headquarters, was informed of the operation by its spies in Gibraltar four hours after Force H had sailed. Ships of the Regia Marina sailed from Naples and Messina commanded by Admiral Inigo Campioni. By the morning of 17 November, the battleships Vittorio Veneto and Giulio Cesare that had survived the Battle of Taranto the British air attack on Taranto Harbour (11/12 November 1940) were at sea. With two heavy cruisers and several destroyers the battleships lay in wait 35 nmi (65 km; 40 mi) south-west of Sardinia.

== Operation ==
=== First wave ===
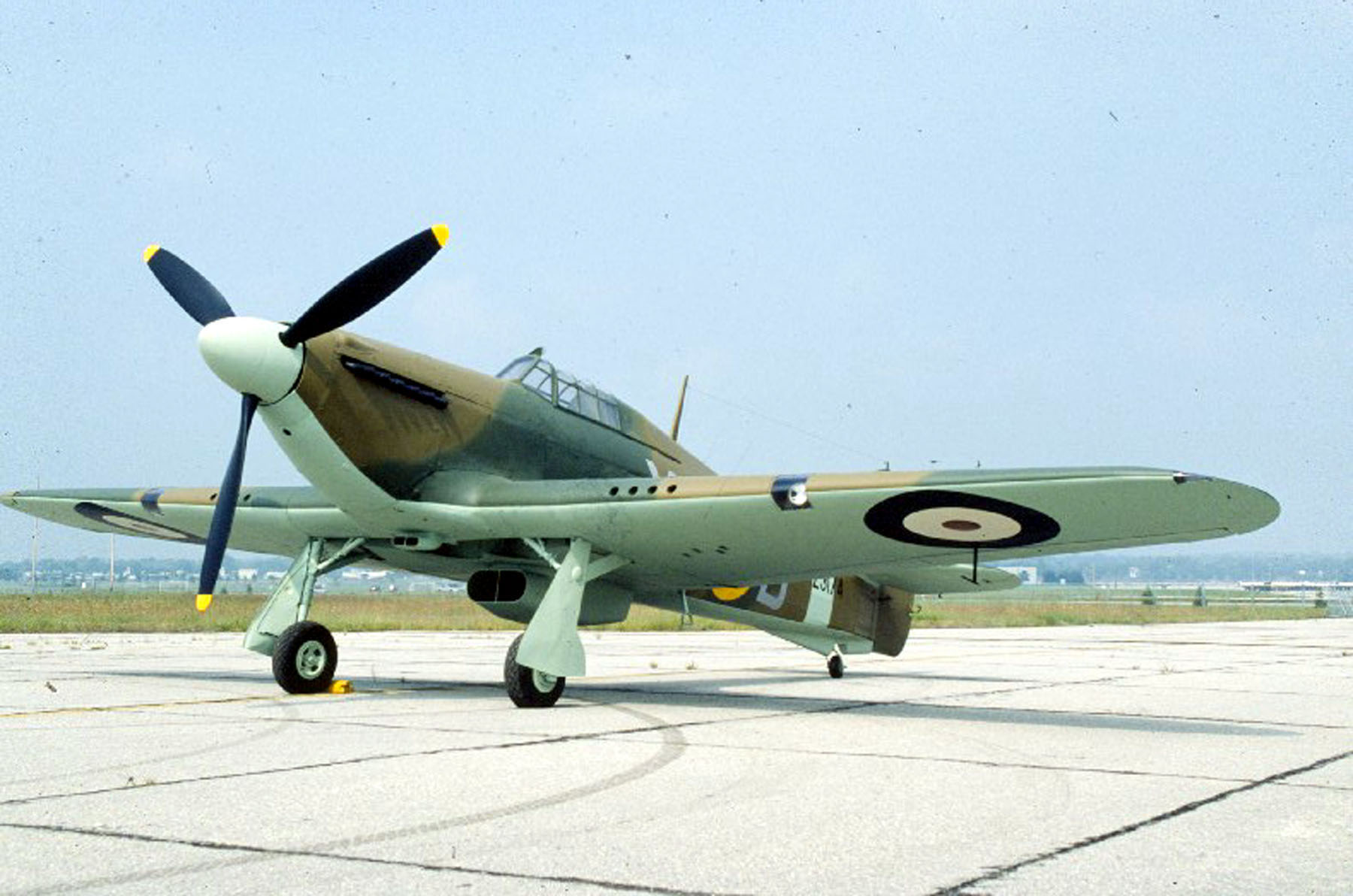
Hawker Hurricane Mk IIA at the National Museum of the United States Air Force

At dawn on 17 November, the first six Hurricanes were brought on deck. (Note: Hurricane V7474, Flight Lieutenant J. A. F. MacLachlan DFC, V7346, Sergeant J. K. Norwell, V7370 Pilot Officer C. E. Hamilton, V7413, Sergeant R. A. Spyer, V7548, Pilot Officer H. W. Eliot, V7374, Sergeant W. G. Cunnington.) The navigating Skua (L2882) was crewed by Sub- Lieutenant (A) Nowell, who had flown on Operation Hurry and Sub-Lieutenant (O) P. Gordon-Smith. lt was about 400 mi (640 km) to Malta; if flown at optimum speed, revs and altitude, the Hurricanes were expected to reach Malta with 45 minutes of fuel left. Engine start was at 6:15 a.m. and it took 15 minutes to get the seven aircraft airborne and formed up into two sections, which used a third of the safety margin. The fighters flew at 150 mph (240 km/h) at a height of 2,000 ft (610 m), far from the optimum height and speed for the distance to be covered.

The 510 mi (820 km)-range of the Hurricane Mk II was achieved at 10,000 ft (3,000 m), not the denser air lower down. The formation unexpectedly encountered a headwind, for which no allowance had been made. The wind backed from south-west to south-east, hampering the eastward flight of the aircraft. Near the Galite Islands, 50 mi (80 km) north of Tunisia and 93 mi (150 km) south of Sardinia, the wave made rendezvous with a Short Sunderland flying boat which lead the formation to Malta. A Hurricane ran out of fuel at 9:08 a.m. 45 nmi (83 km; 52 mi) from Malta and another at 9:12 a.m. One of the pilots was rescued by the Sunderland but the other was lost at sea. The four remaining Hurricanes and the Skua landed at Luqa at 9:20 a.m.

=== Second wave ===
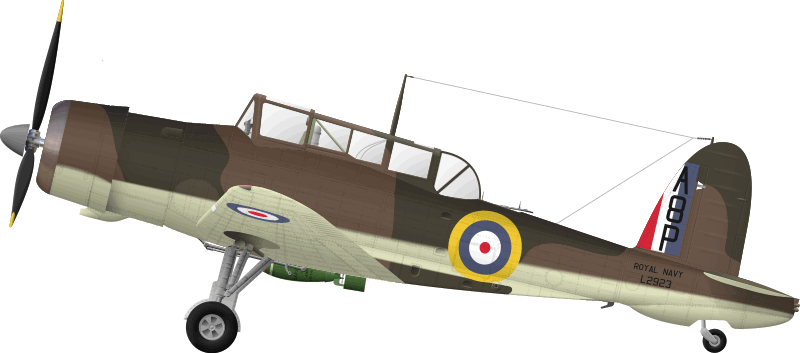
example of a Blackburn Skua (L2923)

The second flight of Hurricanes followed an hour later, their navigating Skua (L2987) flown by Petty Officer (A) W. E. J. Stockwell and Sub-Lieutenant (O) R. C. Neil. (Note: The Hurricanes were flown by Flying Officers R. W. Clarke, E. G. Bidgood, P. W. Horton (New Zealand), J. R. Walker (Canada), and Pilot Officers F. J. Boret and J. M. Horrex.) The flight went wrong from the start, the Sunderland escort from failing to take off from Gibraltar. The headwind increased and the flight missed its landfall at Galite Island, failed to rendezvous with a Maryland sent from Malta and became lost. The Skua navigator radioed for help but his receiver was unserviceable. As the Skua crew searched for land, the Hurricanes dropped out of formation one-by-one and landed in the sea. The Skua was 75 nmi (86 mi; 139 km) off course, and just before it ran out of fuel, the crew saw the southern coast of Sicily through the mist. Anti-aircraft fire damaged the Skua, which crash-landed on the beach at Punta Palo on the Isola delle Correnti, near Syracuse, Stockwell and Neil being taken prisoner. A Maryland from Malta sent to search for survivors found nothing, the six Hurricane pilots having died in the sea.

== Aftermath ==
=== Analysis ===
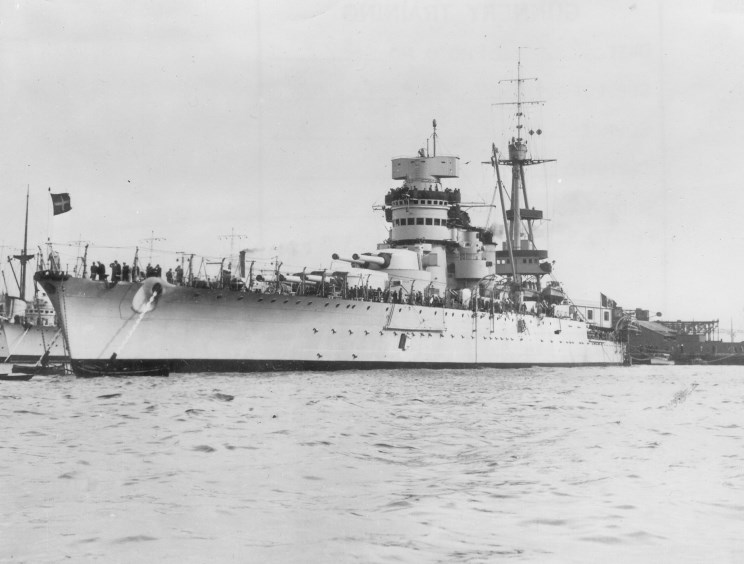
Italian battleship Giulio Cesare, sent to intercept Force H and Argus

MacLachlan wrote in his diary, "Today has been one of the most tragic in my life. Nine [sic] chaps who were alive and well twelve hours ago are dead, and I might easily have been one of them". MacLachlan did not know the fate of the missing Skua and its crew. A few days later, he and Gordon-Smith were summoned to attend a Court of Inquiry at Gibraltar, which found that the loss of the aircraft was "mainly due to a lack of knowledge on the part of the Hurricane pilots as to how to fly their aircraft when fitted with constant speed airscrews" and "bad navigation on the part of the observer of the second Skua". Somerville privately assessed the operation "a frightful failure" and blamed himself. Somerville wrote on the day after the loss of the aircraft, "I feel now that in spite of the risk of meeting superior Italian surface forces, it would have been better if I had proceeded 40 miles further east ..."

=== Court of Inquiry ===
The inquiry blamed the unfamiliarity of the Hurricane pilots with the Hurricane Mk II, with a constant-speed propeller. Poor weather and the use of a navigator in the Skua who was a volunteer reserve officer, on his first operational sortie, which Somerville called "a positive scandal" contributed to the loss of the Hurricanes. Later it was tacitly acknowledged that there had been inadequate weather forecasting and a lack of liaison between Navy and RAF as to the true range of the Hurricane. The pilots were instructed to fly at 2,000 ft (610 m) where the air is "heavier" than at the height prescribed in the handling notes available to the Air Operations Officer aboard Argus. A Hurricane Mk II (fitted for tropical use) in still air, at 130 kn (240 km/h; 150 mph) could fly 521 mi (838 km) at 10,000 ft (3,000 m). Caution in the handling of the fleet played a much greater part in the tragedy than aircrew error and the loss of the pilots was made worse because of their experience gained in England. A Skua navigator and some of the Hurricane pilots made mistakes but these were lesser errors than others in the disaster.

The loss of experienced fighter pilots was particularly painful and before later Club Runs, attempts were made to give pilots some practice in long-range flight over the sea. The Hurricane pilot on Argus, Sergeant C. S. Bamberger, returned to Gibraltar with the carrier, whence he was taken to Malta by the destroyer Hotspur, disembarking on 28 November. Bamberger wrote,

FIight Lieutenant MacLachlan, whom I got to know well in Malta, would not have taken off from the Argus if he had anticipated a flight lasting three hours. On any long-distance flight, particularly if it were over the sea, it would be against the very nature of any fighter pilot not to economise on petrol. To my mind the Navy did not take them close enough.

The Prime Minister, Winston Churchill, wrote that "Never again were the margins cut so fine, and though many similar operations took place in the future never did such a catastrophe recur".

=== Subsequent operations ===
Sergeant Pickering wrote of the survivors, "When the reinforcement arrived, partially, the pilots brought in ideas that had evolved in the Battle of Britain. Apart from air tactics, these included the selection of air leaders other than by seniority in rank". Shortly after midnight on the morning of 22 November an Italian bomber emerged from thick cloud and dropped bombs, which caused little damage and no casualties, while escaping from a Hurricane manoeuvring to intercept. As the bomber flew low over Malta, a machine-gunner opened fire, machine-gun belts fell out of the aircraft and were recovered by troops nearby.

== Orders of battle ==
=== Force H (escort) ===
Force H
| Ship | Flag | Type | Notes |
|---|---|---|---|
| HMS Ark Royal | Royal Navy | Courageous-class aircraft carrier | Bombing raid on Alghero airfield, Sardinia (cancelled) |
| HMS Valiant | Royal Navy | Queen Elizabeth-class battleship | |
| HMS Resolution | Royal Navy | Revenge-class battleship | |
| HMS Arethusa | Royal Navy | Arethusa-class cruiser | |
| HMS Delhi | Royal Navy | Danae-class cruiser | |
| HMS Enterprise | Royal Navy | Emerald-class cruiser | |
| HMS Newcastle | Royal Navy | Town-class cruiser | Independent to Malta (Note: 200 RAF ground crew and spare parts (17–19 November)) |
| HMS Active | Royal Navy | A-class destroyer | |
| HMS Escapade | Royal Navy | E-class destroyer | |
| HMS Faulknor | Royal Navy | F-class destroyer | |
| HMS Fearless | Royal Navy | F-class destroyer | |
| HMS Forester | Royal Navy | F-class destroyer | |
| HMS Foresight | Royal Navy | F-class destroyer | |
| HMS Foxhound | Royal Navy | F-class destroyer | |
| HMS Wrestler | Royal Navy | W-class destroyer | |

=== Fleet Air Arm ===
Aircraft embarked on Ark Royal
| Sqn | Type | Role | Notes |
|---|---|---|---|
| 800 Naval Air Squadron | Skua | Dive bomber | |
| 808 Naval Air Squadron | Fulmar | Fighter | |
| 810 Naval Air Squadron | Swordfish | Torpedo-Spotter-Reconnaissance | |
| 818 Naval Air Squadron | Swordfish | Torpedo-Spotter-Reconnaissance | |
| 820 Naval Air Squadron | Swordfish | Torpedo-Spotter-Reconnaissance | |

=== Close escort ===
HMS Argus and close escorts
| Ship | Flag | Type | Notes |
|---|---|---|---|
| HMS Argus | Royal Navy | Aircraft carrier | 12 Hurricane fighter reinforcements for Malta, 2 Skua guides |
| HMS Encounter | Royal Navy | E-class destroyer | Close escort |
| HMS Gallant | Royal Navy | G-class destroyer | Close escort |
| HMS Greyhound | Royal Navy | G-class destroyer | Close escort |
| HMS Hotspur | Royal Navy | H-class destroyer | Close escort |

=== RAF–Fleet Air Arm ===
Aircraft embarked on Argus
| Sqn | Type | Role | Notes |
|---|---|---|---|
| Royal Air Force | Hurricane | Fighter | 12 aircraft, pilots not members of squadrons |
| 800 Naval Air Squadron FAA | Skua | Fighter/dive-bomber | Two navigation aircraft to guide the Hurricane pilots |

=== Regia Marina ===
Italian surface ships
| Ship | Flag | Type | Notes |
|---|---|---|---|
| Vittorio Veneto | Kingdom of Italy | Littorio-class battleship | |
| Giulio Cesare | Kingdom of Italy | Conte di Cavour-class battleship | |
| Bolzano | Kingdom of Italy | Trento-class cruiser | |
| Trento | Kingdom of Italy | Trento-class cruiser | |
| Trieste | Kingdom of Italy | Trento-class cruiser | |
| — | Kingdom of Italy | Destroyers | 14 Destroyer escorts |

=== Italian submarine pickets ===
Italian submarines
| Ship | Flag | Type | Notes |
|---|---|---|---|
| Argo | Kingdom of Italy | Argo-class submarine | |
| Axum | Kingdom of Italy | Adua-class submarine | |
| Diaspro | Kingdom of Italy | Perla-class submarine | |
| Luciano Manara | Kingdom of Italy | Bandiera-class submarine | |
| Medusa | Kingdom of Italy | Argonauta-class submarine | |
| Neghelli | Kingdom of Italy | Adua-class submarine | |
| Scirè | Kingdom of Italy | Adua-class submarine | |
| Turchese | Kingdom of Italy | Perla-class submarine | |

== See also ==
- Operation Collar
- Battle of Cape Spartivento
