= Operation Accolade =

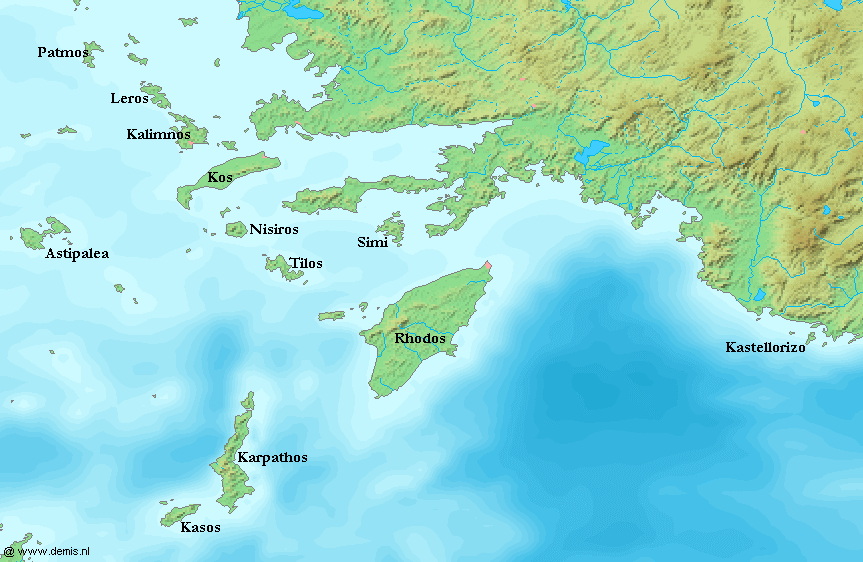
The Dodecanese Islands

During World War II, Operation Accolade was a planned British amphibious assault on Rhodes and the Dodecanese Islands in the Aegean Sea. Advocated by the British Prime Minister, Winston Churchill, as a follow-up to the capture of Sicily in 1943 from Operation Husky, it was cancelled on 25 December 1943 to focus on the assault on Anzio. The allies did not, then, gain all of the Dodecanese. Most notably, the Germans still had possession of Rhodes. The operation in the Dodecanese, though, kept many German troops occupied in the area.

The Chief of the Imperial General Staff (CIGS) Alan Brooke was opposed to Churchill's "Rhodes madness", saying he had "worked himself into a frenzy of excitement about the Rhodes attack". Alan Brooke was opposed to it as a distraction from the Italian campaign and also as endangering their relations with the President (6, 8 October 1943), although he also thought that Crete and Rhodes might have been easily captured earlier if the Americans had agreed, and "the war might have been finished by 1943". (1 November 1943)

== See also ==
- 37th (Tyne Electrical Engineers) Light Anti-Aircraft Regiment, Royal Artillery
- Sholto Douglas, 1st Baron Douglas of Kirtleside
- Operation Hercules
- Operation Mandibles
