= Operation Saxifrage =

- Part of the Italian campaign of World War II
Date	27 October 1943
Location	East coast of Italy
Result	Operation successful: Railway was destroyed

Belligerents
(United Kingdom) 2nd SAS	Germany

Commanders and leaders
Major Roy Farran; Lieutenant Grant Hibbert	

Strength
16 Commandos	

During World War II, Operation Saxifrage was a raid by four small Special Air Service teams who landed on the east coast of Italy on the night of 27 October 1943.

In charge of the operation was Major Roy Farran and Lieutenant Grant Hibbert. The SAS were inserted via boat, somewhere between Pescara and Ancona, using the Tronto river and by late evening, had made landfall with the 16 commandos being divided into 4 teams.

After trekking in the bad conditions, the men hunkered down as daylight approached and continued on after sunset, meeting up at 21:00 (28 October) with the other raiding parties of Candytuft. They placed the explosives on the railway lines and by midnight the charges had gone off, destroying the line, however, not immediately being heard by the Germans due to the bad weather.

Continuous attacks by the SAS went on for the next 4 days before the commandos pulled out and re-joined with a Royal Navy ship.

== See also ==
- Operation Candytuft
