= HMS Argus (I49) =

1918 British aircraft carrier

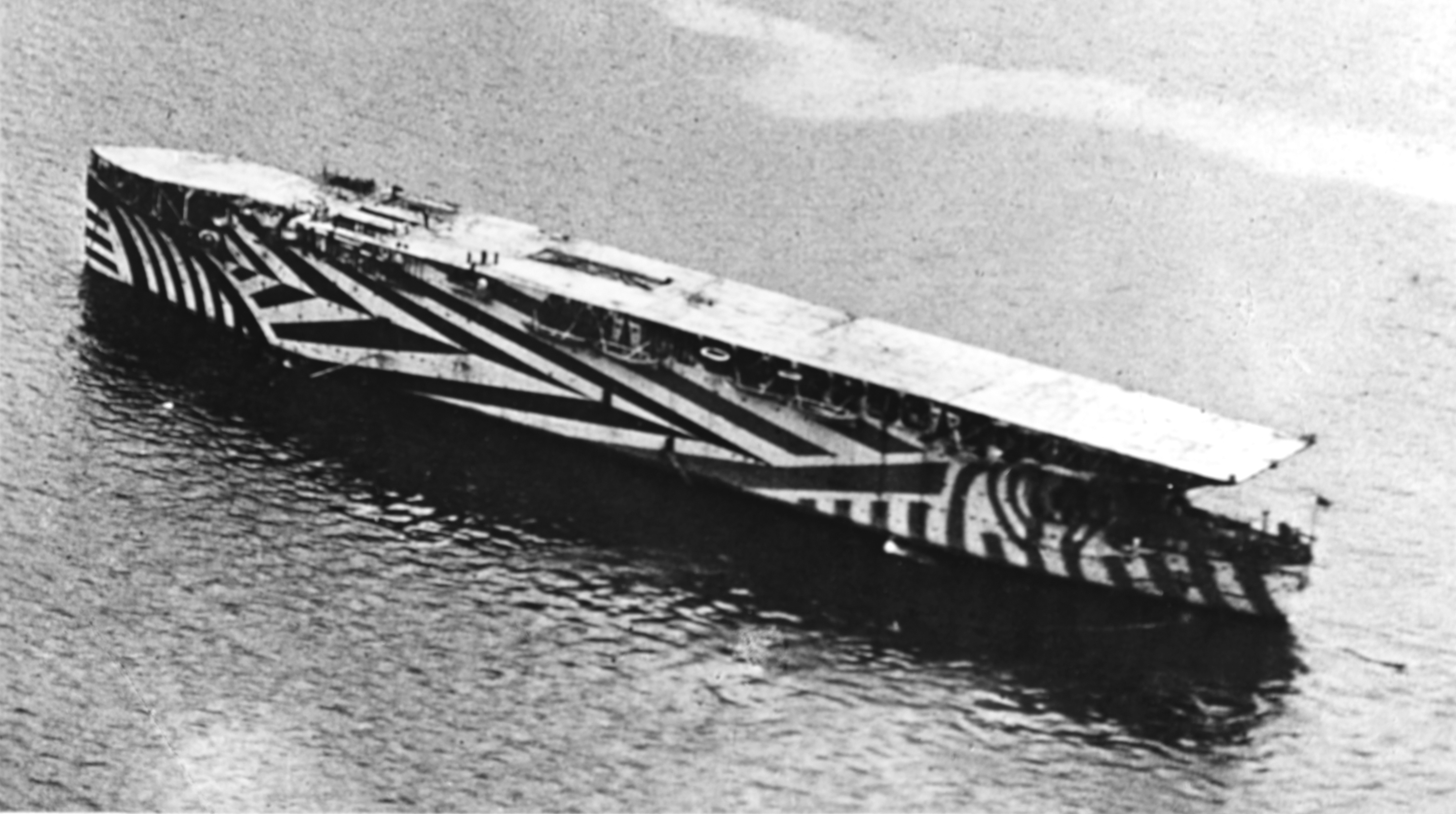
- Argus in harbour in 1918, painted in dazzle camouflage

History

United Kingdom
- Name: Argus
- Namesake: Argus Panoptes
- Builder: William Beardmore, Dalmuir
- Yard number: 519
- Identification: Pennant number: I49
- Nickname(s): Hat Box; Flatiron
- Laid down: 1914
- Acquired: September 1916
- Launched: 2 December 1917
- Commissioned: 16 September 1918
- Decommissioned: About 1929
- Recommissioned: 30 July 1938
- Reclassified: As accommodation ship, December 1944
- Fate: Sold for scrap, 5 December 1946

General characteristics (as built)
- Type: Aircraft carrier
- Displacement: 14,450 long tons (14,680 t) (standard load)
- Length: 565 ft (172.2 m) (o/a)
- Beam: 68 ft (20.7 m)
- Draught: 23 ft 3 in (7.1 m) (deep load)
- Installed power: 12 × cylindrical boilers; 20,000 shp (15,000 kW)
- Propulsion: 4 × shafts; 4 × steam turbines
- Speed: 20 knots (37 km/h; 23 mph)
- Range: 3,600 nmi (6,700 km; 4,100 mi) at 10 knots (19 km/h; 12 mph)
- Complement: 495
- Armament: 4 × 4 in (102 mm) AA guns; 2 × low-angle 4-inch guns
- Aircraft carried: 15–18

HMS Argus was a British aircraft carrier that served in the Royal Navy from 1918 to 1944. She was converted from an ocean liner that was under construction when the First World War began and became the first aircraft carrier with a full-length flight deck that allowed wheeled aircraft to take off and land. After commissioning, the ship was involved for several years in the development of the optimum design for other aircraft carriers. Argus also evaluated various types of arresting gear, general procedures needed to operate a number of aircraft in concert, and fleet tactics. The ship was too top-heavy as originally built, and had to be modified to improve her stability in the mid-1920s. She spent one brief deployment on the China Station in the late 1920s before being placed in reserve for budgetary reasons.

Argus was recommissioned and partially modernised shortly before the Second World War and served as a training ship for deck-landing practice until June 1940. The following month she made the first of her many ferry trips to the Western Mediterranean to fly off fighters to Malta; she was largely occupied in this task for the next two years. The ship also delivered aircraft to Murmansk, Russia, Takoradi in the Gold Coast, and Reykjavík, Iceland. By 1942, the Royal Navy was very short of aircraft carriers, and Argus was pressed into front-line service despite her lack of speed and armament. In June, she participated in Operation Harpoon, providing air cover for the Malta-bound convoy. In November, the ship provided air cover during Operation Torch, the invasion of French North Africa, and was slightly damaged by a bomb. After returning to the UK for repairs, Argus was used again for deck-landing practice until late September 1944. In December, she became an accommodation ship, and was listed for disposal in mid-1946. The ship was sold in late 1946 and scrapped the following year.

== Design, description and construction ==
Argus had her genesis in the Admiralty's desire during the First World War for an aircraft carrier that could fly off wheeled aircraft and land them aboard. Existing carriers could launch wheeled aircraft, but had no way to recover them as they lacked flight decks. In 1912, the ship builder William Beardmore and Company had proposed to the Admiralty an aircraft carrier design with a continuous, full-length flight deck, but it was not accepted. As the limitations of existing carriers became more apparent, this design was dusted off and the Admiralty located two large, fast hulls suitable for conversion into an aircraft carrier. Construction of the Italian ocean liners Conte Rosso and Giulio Cesare had been suspended by Beardmore at the outbreak of the war, and both met the Admiralty's criteria. Conte Rosso was purchased on 20 September 1916, possibly because her machinery was more complete than that of Giulio Cesare, and the company began work on converting the ship.

James Graham, 6th Duke of Montrose, a director of the Beardmore company, proposed to the Admiralty a design, "A Parent Ship for Naval Aeroplanes and Torpedo Boat Destroyer" in 1912. The initial design had two islands with the flight deck running between them. Each island contained one funnel; a large net could be strung between them to stop out-of-control aircraft. The islands were connected by braces and the bridge was mounted on top of the bracing, which left a clear height of 20 feet (6.1 m) for the aircraft on the flight deck. Fairly early in the design process, the decision was made to delete the funnels to reduce turbulence over the flight deck. The exhaust gases were, instead, ducted aft in the space between the roof of the hangar deck and the flight deck and were enclosed by a casing through which cooler air was driven by electric fans. They normally exhausted underneath the aft end of the flight deck, but the exhaust could be vented through openings on the rear side of the hull by two large electric fans.

In November 1916, the ship's design was tested in a wind tunnel by the National Physical Laboratory to evaluate the turbulence caused by the twin islands and the bridge over them. They were found to cause problems, but no changes were made until the ship was nearly complete. In April 1918, Argus was ordered to be modified to a flush-decked configuration after the sea trials of the carrier Furious had revealed severe turbulence problems caused by her superstructure. The ship was given a bridge underneath her flight deck, extending from side to side, and she was fitted with a retractable pilot house in the middle of the flight deck for use when not operating aircraft.

Argus's stability had been a concern from the beginning. Despite having been originally conceived as a liner with a hull designed to minimise rolling, most of the changes made to the ship during her conversion added topside weight, raising her centre of gravity. Even the addition of 600 long tons (610 t) of ballast still left the ship with a very low metacentric height of only 1.6 feet (0.49 m) lightly loaded and 3.8 feet (1.2 m) at deep load. This meant she was very steady, but heeled noticeably when turning. The ship proved to be very manoeuvrable at medium and high speeds, but steered badly at low speeds and in wind due to her large surface area.

Argus had an overall length of 565 feet (172.2 m), a beam of 68 feet (20.7 m), and a draught of 23 feet 3 inches (7.1 m) at deep load. She displaced 14,450 long tons (14,680 t) at standard load and 15,575 long tons (15,825 t) at deep load. Each of the ship's four sets of Parsons geared steam turbines drove one propeller shaft. Steam was supplied by 12 cylindrical boilers. The turbines were designed for a total of 20,000 shaft horsepower (15,000 kW), but they produced 21,376 shaft horsepower (15,940 kW) during her sea trials in September 1918, and gave Argus a speed of 20.506 knots (37.977 km/h; 23.598 mph). The ship carried 2,500 long tons (2,500 t) of fuel oil, which gave her a range of 3,600 nautical miles (6,700 km; 4,100 mi) at 10 knots (19 km/h; 12 mph).

The ship's flight deck was 549 feet (167.3 m) long and her hangar was 330 feet (100.6 m) long, 48–68 feet (14.6–20.7 m) wide, and 16 feet (4.9 m) high. Aircraft were transported between the hangar and the flight deck by two aircraft lifts; the forward lift measured 30 by 36 feet (9.1 m × 11.0 m) and the rear 60 by 18 feet (18.3 m × 5.5 m). Argus was the only British carrier serving in the Second World War capable of striking down (stowing away) aircraft with non-folding wings because of her wide lifts and tall hangar ceiling. Three fire curtains divided the hangar and another separated the hangar and the quarterdeck. She could accommodate between 15 and 18 aircraft. No arresting gear was fitted as completed. Two large cranes were positioned on the quarterdeck, beneath the rear of the flight deck. Petrol storage consisted of 8,000 imperial gallons (36,000 L; 9,600 US gal) in 2-imperial-gallon (9.1 L; 2.4 US gal) tins stowed below the waterline. The ship's crew totalled 495 officers and men.

The ship was armed with four 4-inch (102 mm) anti-aircraft guns, two on the quarterdeck and one on each side of the hull. She was also fitted with two low-angle 4-inch guns, one also on each side of the hull. The rear magazine and the torpedo warhead storage magazine were protected by a total of 2 inches (51 mm) of protective plating on all sides, but the forward magazine and bomb storage rooms had only a 2-inch thick deck to protect them.

== Construction and career ==
Argus, named after Argus of the 100 Eyes from Greek mythology, was laid down in 1914 as yard number 519 by Beardmore at its shipyard in Dalmuir as the Conte Rosso. She was renamed after her purchase in September 1916 and was launched on 2 December 1917, construction having been slowed by labour shortages, and commissioned on 16 September 1918. The ship was nicknamed the "Hat Box", "Ditty Box" or the "Flatiron" because of her flat-topped appearance.

=== 1918–1939 ===
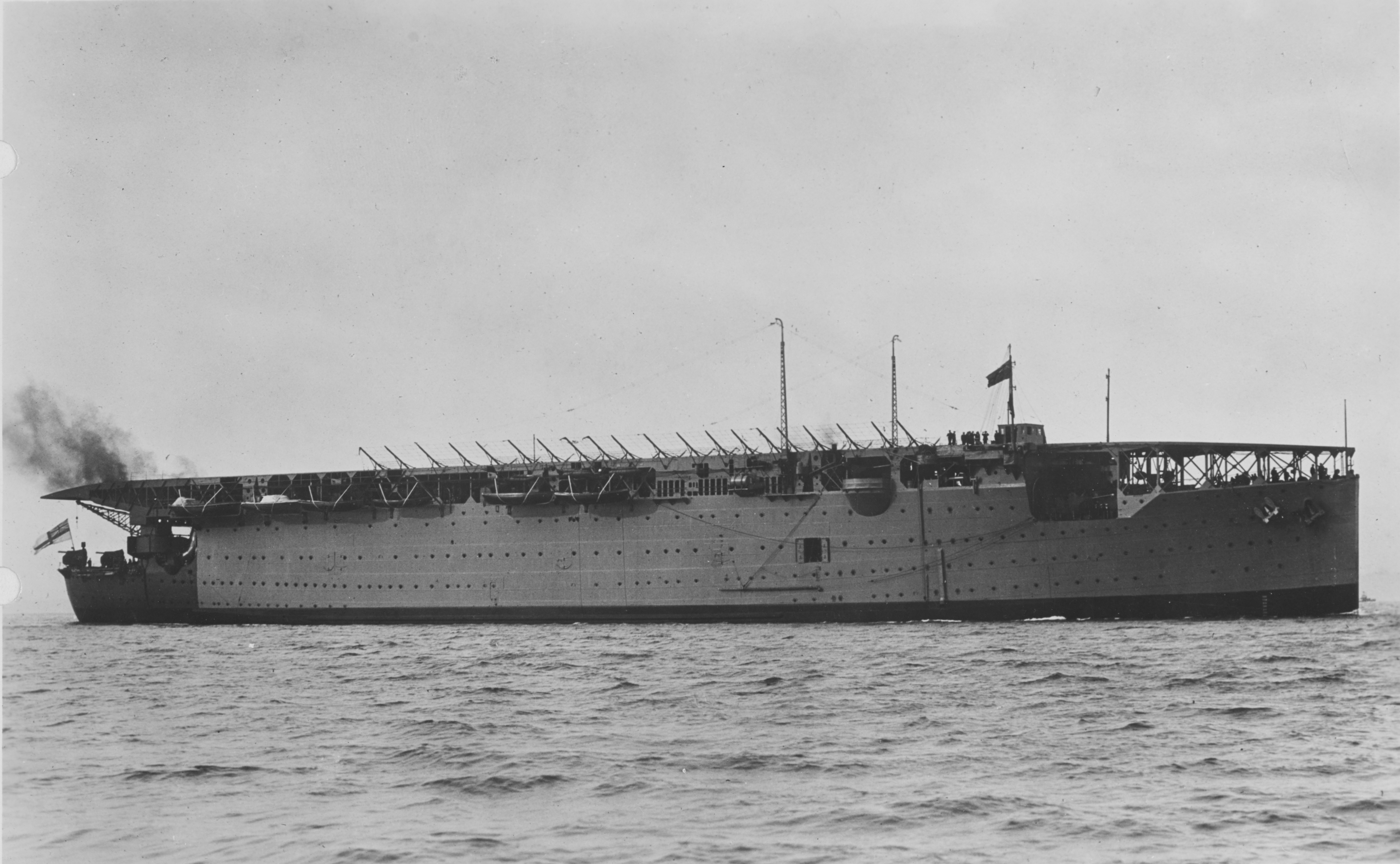
Argus in the late 1920s

After commissioning too late to participate in the First World War, Argus was tasked to conduct deck-landing trials with longitudinal arresting gear transferred from Furious. The first landings on the ship were made on 24 September 1918 by two Sopwith Ship Strutter aeroplanes from the Grand Fleet's airbase at Turnhouse. The same month, the ship was used in trials to evaluate the effects which an island superstructure would have on flying operations, with a canvas-and-wood dummy island being installed with a smoke box to simulate funnel gases. By 19 December, 36 successful landings had been made by Ship Strutters and Sopwith Pups. Argus was refitted from 23 December to 21 March 1919 with modified arresting gear. The wires of the arresting gear had been lifted off the deck so they could engage the hooks on the undercarriages of the aircraft, but this prevented the use of the flight deck for any other purpose. The after lift was therefore lowered 9 inches (229 mm), which allowed aircraft to use the area when the lift was raised flush with the rest of the flight deck. Trials began in April and the lift was widened in October. Argus joined the Atlantic Fleet in January 1920 for her Spring Cruise carrying a total of sixteen airplanes, eight Ship Strutters, four Sopwith Camel fighters, two Airco DH.9A bombers and two Fairey floatplanes. Operational experience confirmed that the aircraft should attempt to land directly onto the arresting gear lest they be blown over the side of the carrier, as happened three times during the cruise.

After the ship's return from her cruise, a conference was convened aboard Argus on 19 May to consider revised landing arrangements. It was decided that a longer system of wires was needed, and the landing well system was abandoned in favour of ramps that could be raised and lowered as needed. Powered palisades were also needed on the side of the flight deck to help retain aircraft aboard that had not engaged a wire. The revised system was successfully tested aboard the carrier Eagle later in the year and Argus' arresting gear was modified accordingly in time for the 1921 Spring Cruise, during which the ship carried ten Parnall Panther spotter and reconnaissance aircraft and three Fairey IIIC reconnaissance aircraft. In addition, the ship's aft lift was permanently locked in the raised position and 150 long tons (150 t) of ballast were added to compensate for the additional weight of the equipment high in the ship. This cruise was deemed very successful as 45 landings were made, only two of which resulted in serious accidents, an accident rate comparable to those of land-based units. The time required to launch two aircraft and land one aboard was forty minutes during this cruise, primarily because the rotary engines of the time were very difficult to start.

In September 1922, Argus, equipped with Gloster Nightjar fighters, was deployed to the Dardanelles as a response to the Chanak crisis. As well as operating her own aircraft, Argus was used to fly off Bristol Fighters that had been ferried to the Dardanelles aboard the seaplane carrier Ark Royal to an airfield at Kilia on the European side of the straits. (The aircraft could not be flown off Ark Royal since she was a seaplane carrier with no flight deck. The Bristol Fighters were transferred to Argus by crane).

In July 1922, Argus was inclined to evaluate her stability in light of the additional weights that had been added since her completion and it was discovered that her metacentric height had been reduced by 0.83 feet (0.3 m). The Director of Naval Construction proposed to fit her with a girdle at her waterline to increase her beam and thus her stability. He intended to do this under the 1923–1924 Naval Programme, but this was delayed several times as the ship was needed for training and when she was finally modified it was under the 1925–1926 Naval Programme. Girdling increased her deep displacement to 16,750 long tons (17,020 t) and her beam to 74 feet (22.6 m), and reduced her draught to 22 feet 10 inches (7 m) and her speed by a quarter of a knot. The ship was also fitted with bulk petrol storage, new four-inch guns that used fixed ammunition, and new radio masts.

Argus usually operated about 15 aircraft during the 1920s. This was commonly divided up between one small flight of fighters (Gloster Nightjars or Fairey Flycatchers), one of spotters (Parnall Panthers or Avro Bisons), and one spotter reconnaissance flight with Fairey IIIs.

The ship's hull was surveyed in 1927 and anticipated to be sound for another 15 years, and she relieved Hermes on the China Station from 1 September to 20 March 1928. Sometime after her return, Argus was laid up at Plymouth at 14-days readiness to save money. Since she was completed before 9 December 1921, the Washington Naval Treaty classified her as an experimental aircraft carrier and thus she could have been scrapped to release treaty-limited tonnage for new construction. The ship was reduced to Extended Reserve (four months readiness) at Rosyth in September 1932. In February 1936, it was decided to refit the ship as a tender for Queen Bee target drones. The opportunity was taken to widen her flight deck by 10 feet (3 m) and replace her old boilers with destroyer-type boilers which could generate more steam than her turbines could handle. The boilers were taken from scrapped destroyers of the V and W class which were being broken up at Inverkeithing. The ship was intended to have one hydro-pneumatic aircraft catapult, but this was instead diverted to Ark Royal. Since Argus was now classified as a naval auxiliary, her four-inch guns were removed. Her refit was completed on 30 July 1938 and she underwent sea trials the following month. She was classified as a Target Aeroplane Carrier and recommissioned on 11 August 1938 with Captain W. G. Benn in command.

=== Second World War ===
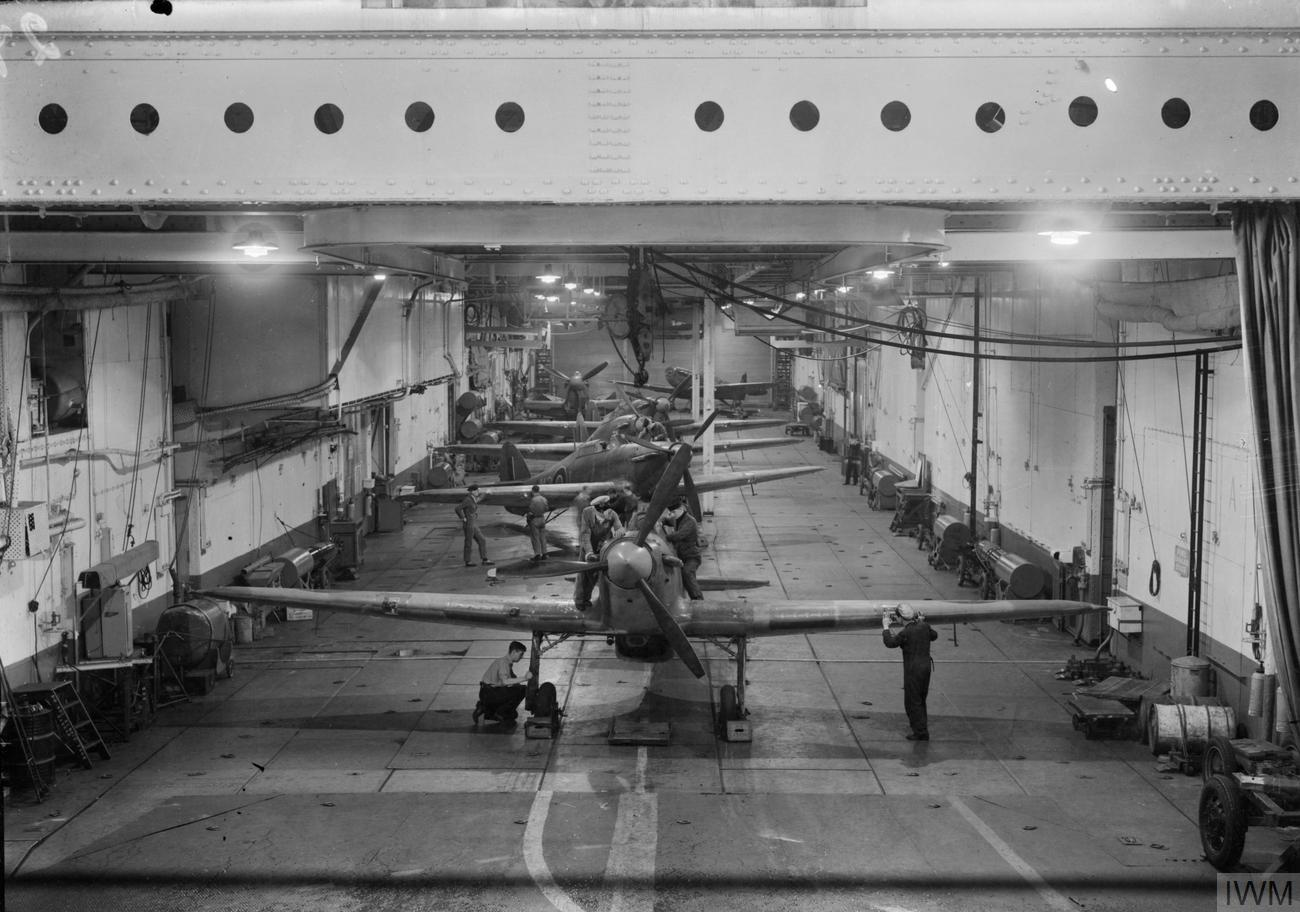
Five Sea Hurricanes and a single Seafire lined up in the hangar, c. 1942–1944

After recommissioning, Argus served as a training carrier to allow pilots to practice their deck-landing skills. She was carrying out this duty in the Gulf of Lion when the Second World War began. By April 1940, the ship had been rearmed with two QF Mk V 4-inch anti-aircraft guns on her quarterdeck, as well as three quadruple Vickers .50 machine gun mounts; one of these was on each side of her hull and the third was on the centreline of the quarterdeck. Together with the battlecruiser Hood and six destroyers, Argus escorted Convoy US-3, loaded with Australian and New Zealand troops, to the United Kingdom in mid-June. A week later, she ferried Supermarine Walrus amphibians of 701 Squadron to Reykjavík, Iceland. Argus loaded a dozen Hawker Hurricane and two Blackburn Skua fighters of 418 Flight RAF in late July for delivery to Malta as part of Operation Hurry. Escorted by Ark Royal, three battleships, two cruisers and 10 destroyers, the ship flew them off without incident on 2 August 1940 from a point west of Sicily, although two of the Hurricanes crashed on landing. Accompanied by the battleship Valiant and escorted by two destroyers, she returned to Liverpool to load 30 Hurricanes with their wings removed. Argus sailed on 22 August and arrived at Takoradi on the Gold Coast on 5 September where her aircraft were off-loaded. After her return to the United Kingdom, the ship was briefly refitted and she ferried 701 Squadron back to the United Kingdom in late October.

On 11 November, Argus sailed again from Liverpool with a deck-load of a dozen Hurricanes and two Skuas for delivery to Malta (Operation White). She rendezvoused with Force H four days later and launched the aircraft on the morning of 17 November. Eight of the Hurricanes ran out of fuel en route due to headwinds and one Skua was forced to crash land on Sicily after it had been damaged by Italian flak. In mid-December, the ship embarked six Fairey Swordfish torpedo bombers of 821X Squadron for delivery to Gibraltar and another pair of Swordfish from 825 Squadron for self-defence. The carrier rendezvoused with Furious and Convoy WS-5A before the combined force was discovered by the German cruiser Admiral Hipper on 25 December, but little damage was inflicted by Hipper before she was driven off by the escorts. No air strike could be flown against the German cruiser because the Swordfish were embarked in Argus with bombs that they could not carry and the torpedoes were aboard Furious. After Furious's Skuas had flown off to search for Hipper, space was cleared to allow Argus' Swordfish to load the torpedoes, but the Skuas could not locate Hipper because of the poor visibility. Argus delivered 821X Squadron to Gibraltar and was back in the United Kingdom by 14 January 1941.

In March, the carrier loaded a dozen Hurricane IIs and three Skuas and delivered them to Gibraltar on 29 March, where they were loaded onto Ark Royal and flown off to Malta a few days later. She returned to the United Kingdom on 11 April and loaded six replacement Swordfish as well as six Swordfish of 812 Squadron for self-defence. After a brief refit, Argus sailed on 14 April for Gibraltar to transfer the replacements to Ark Royal. She arrived on 24 April and began a two-week refit after the aircraft were transferred. The ship was back in the United Kingdom, loading another batch of Hurricanes bound for Gibraltar. Three Fulmars of 800X Squadron were also embarked to protect the ship against the Focke-Wulf Fw 200 Condors that patrolled the Bay of Biscay and the Eastern Atlantic. The carrier arrived on 31 May and disembarked all her aircraft, including 800X Squadron. On her return to the United Kingdom she began a refit.

In late August to early September, Argus transported 24 Hurricanes of No. 151 Wing RAF to Murmansk, Russia. She then ferried a dozen Fairey Albacore torpedo bombers of 828 Squadron to Gibraltar on 30 September for eventual delivery to Malta. She was to ferry the fighters of 804 Squadron on her return trip to England, but this was cancelled. Eventually, the ship loaded some damaged aircraft and accompanied Eagle back to the United Kingdom on 20 October. Argus loaded more Hurricanes for Gibraltar and also embarked a pair of Swordfish from 818 Squadron and two Sea Hurricanes from 804X Squadron for self-defence. The ship arrived on 8 November and she transferred some of her Hurricanes to Ark Royal. Two days later, the two carriers, in Operation Perpetual, sailed to the west of Sicily and flew off their 37 Hurricanes; three of the fighters were lost en route. Ark Royal was torpedoed and sunk during the return to Gibraltar, which forced Argus to remain there to provide cover for Force H as the sole carrier available.

==== 1942–1946 ====
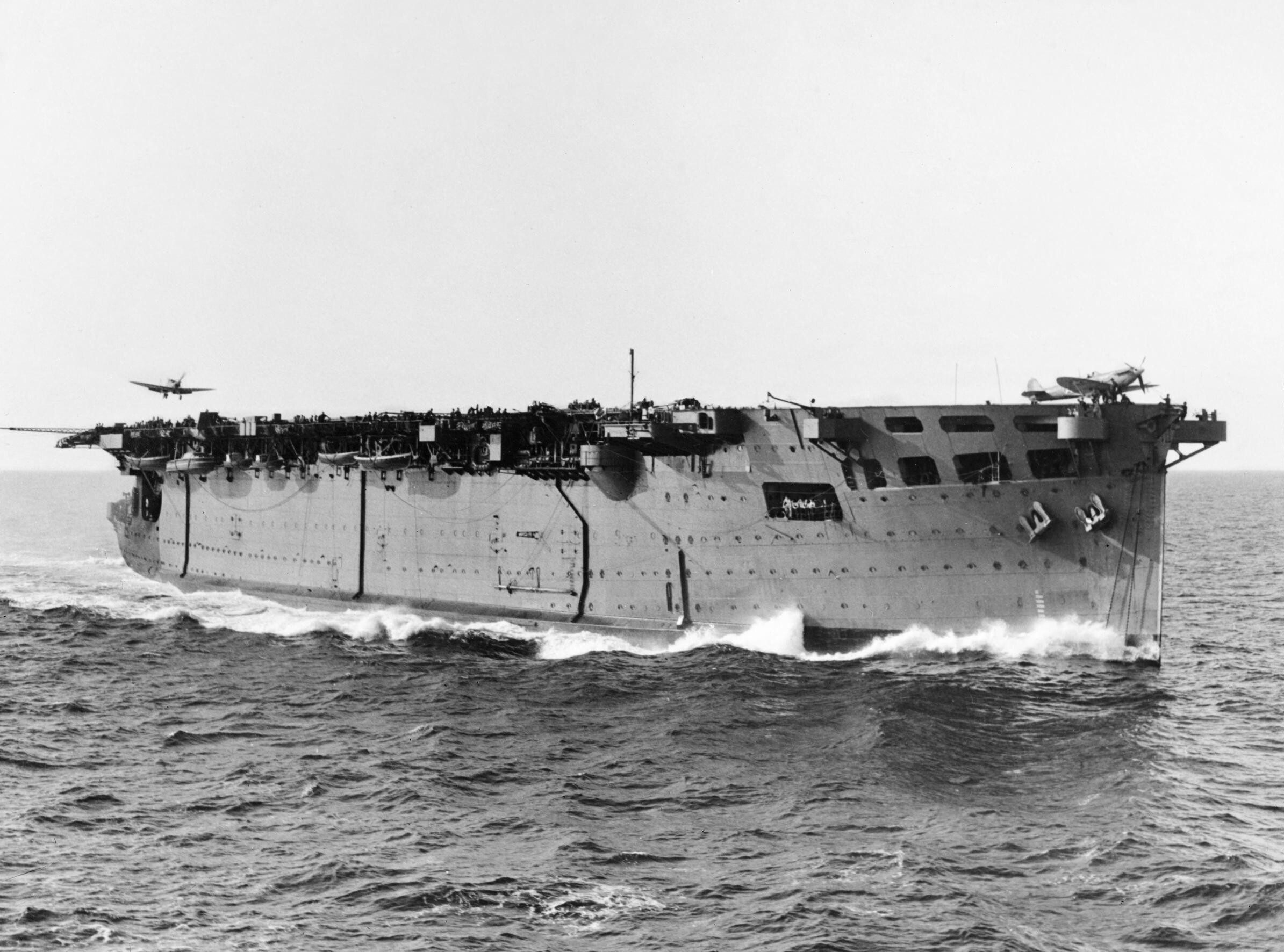
Argus at sea during Operation Torch in late 1942

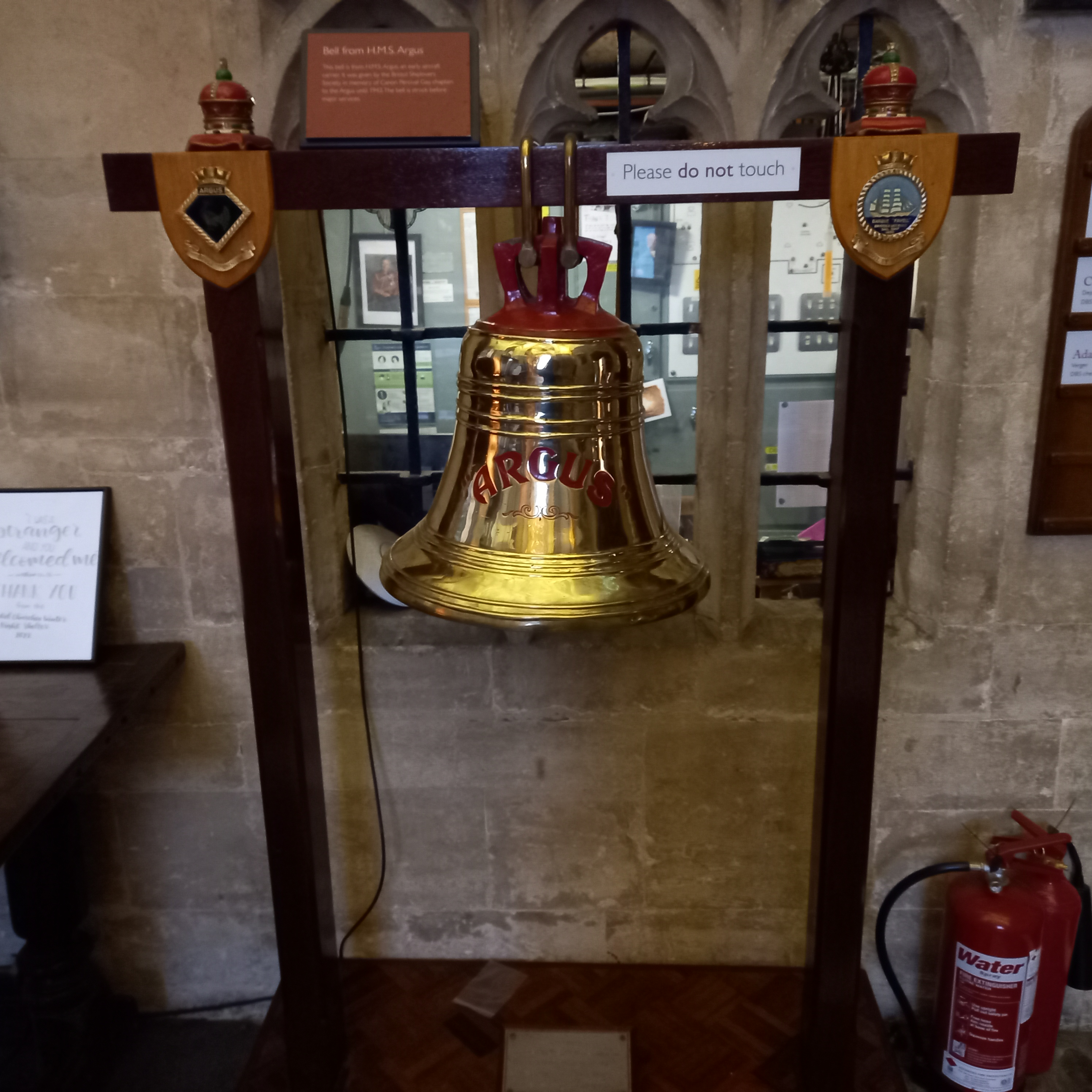
The ship's bell of Argus in Bristol Cathedral

Force H was recalled to the United Kingdom in January and Argus loaded 12 Swordfish of 812 Squadron for her own protection. Whilst in the United Kingdom, she loaded some Supermarine Spitfire fighters and returned to Gibraltar on 24 February. There, the ship transferred the Spitfires to Eagle and embarked nine Fairey Fulmar fighters of 807 Squadron. The plan for Operation Spotter I was for Argus to provide fighter cover for Eagle as she flew off the Spitfires for Malta, but the operation had to be cancelled when the long-range fuel tanks of the Spitfires proved defective. The problems were not rectified until 7 March, when the 15 Spitfires were successfully flown off. During Operation Picket I, nine more Spitfires were flown off by Eagle on 21 March whilst a dozen Sea Hurricane IIBs from 804 Squadron provided air cover from Argus. The two carriers repeated the delivery on 29 March when Eagle flew off seven more Spitfires whilst 807 Squadron provided air cover from Argus. The latter ship also carried six Albacores bound for Malta as well, but the weather deteriorated over Malta and their fly-off was cancelled.

Another attempt to deliver the Albacores and more Spitfires was made during Operation LB. As usual, Argus provided the air cover with a dozen Fulmars from 807 Squadron and Eagle ferried the Albacores and 17 Spitfires to their take-off point for Malta on 19 May. The Spitfires were flown off successfully, but the engines of the Albacores all began to overheat and they were forced to return to the carrier. Examination of the aircraft revealed that their air coolers had been set to "Winter" rather than "Summer". One of the Fulmars was shot down by Vichy French Dewoitine D.520 fighters as it attempted to protect the crew of a Consolidated PBY Catalina flying boat that had been shot down earlier. By this time the ship's Vickers .50-calibre machine guns had been replaced by 13 Oerlikon 20 mm light anti-aircraft guns.

Afterwards, the ship returned to the UK to ferry 801 Squadron to Gibraltar and delivered the unit on 7 June. Together with Eagle, Argus was tasked to provide air cover over Force H as it covered a convoy attempting to get desperately needed supplies through to Malta later in June (Operation Harpoon). The carrier embarked two Fulmars from 807 Squadron, nine Swordfish from 813 Squadron and four more Swordfish from 824 Squadron to protect the convoy from submarines while Eagle loaded 20 Fulmars and Sea Hurricanes from three different squadrons. One Swordfish crashed while landing on 13 June and the wreckage was pushed over the side. Both Fulmars from 807 Squadron were shot down on 14 June by Italian bombers, but they likely shot down one Savoia-Marchetti SM.79 and one CANT Z.1007 bomber. Eagle transferred her Fulmars to Argus over the course of the battle and two more were lost later in the day. The ship was attacked multiple times by bombs and torpedoes during the battle without effect.

As part of the preparations for another resupply convoy for Malta (Operation Pedestal), Argus returned to the United Kingdom in late June to load reserve aircraft, including six Sea Hurricanes of 804 Squadron, for the other aircraft carriers involved in the operation and left the Clyde on 2 August for Gibraltar. The ship rendezvoused with the other carriers on 5 August for a three-day training exercise to work out co-ordination procedures before the operation commenced and 804 Squadron was deemed not ready for combat. It was ordered to return to the UK aboard Argus.

In November 1942, Argus was assigned to the Eastern Naval Task Force that invaded Algiers, Algeria, during the Allied landings in French North Africa with 18 Supermarine Seafire IICs of 880 Squadron aboard. The ship was hit by a bomb on 10 November that killed four men. She and the escort carrier Avenger joined a convoy returning to the United Kingdom on the evening of 14/15 November that was spotted by the Germans. Later that morning U-155 torpedoed and sank Avenger, which was right behind Argus in the convoy. Argus was under repair for a month after she reached the United Kingdom, but required a more thorough refit that lasted from February to May 1943. Reclassified as an escort carrier after the completion of her refit, she was relegated to deck-landing training. She was ordered to be paid off on 27 January 1944, but this order was apparently revoked as she continued training until 27 September 1944 when the last take-off was made from her deck, a Fairey Swordfish. In March, she was ordered to be converted to an aircraft freighter around the end of the year, but this plan was also apparently cancelled. Argus became an accommodation ship at Chatham in December and she was approved for scrapping on 6 May 1946. She was sold to Thos. W. Ward on 5 December 1946 and arrived at Inverkeithing later that month to be broken up. The ship's bell from Argus is preserved in Bristol Cathedral as a memorial to Canon Percival Gay, who was the warship's last chaplain.
