= Operation Cold Comfort =

During World War II, Operation Cold Comfort was a failed SAS raid that began with a parachute drop north of Verona on 17 February 1945. It was later renamed Zombie.

The twelve man ski team was led by Captain Ross Robertson Littlejohn MC; the men and their equipment were widely scattered in the drop, and thereafter they found themselves among hostile locals of essentially German origin. Their mission was to block by landslide the main rail lines through the Brenner Pass, thus having a dramatic effect on German reinforcements moving south.

The men spent most of their time in hiding and attempts to supply and reinforce by air were unsuccessful. Captain Littlejohn and Corporal Joseph Crowley were captured and executed on 9 March under Hitler’s Commando Order. Eventually on 31 March the situation had worsened to the point exfiltration was ordered.
