= Operation Candytuft =

- Part of the Italian campaign of World War II
Date	27 October 1943 - 2 November 1943
Location	Ancona and Pescara, Italy
Result	British victory

Belligerents
United Kingdom	Germany

Commanders and leaders
Major Roy Farran	

Strength
16 soldiers	

Casualties and losses
Two captured	

Operation Candytuft was an operation conducted by the British 2nd Special Air Service (SAS) during the Second World War. It took place on the east coast of Italy, between the towns of Ancona and Pescara, from 27th of October 1943 to 2nd of November 1943. The 16 man force under the command of Major Roy Farran aimed to disrupt German transport and communications by cutting the coastal railway. By the end of the mission, the force had successfully damaged railways, roads and communications, with two men captured.

== Background ==
In late 1943, the east coast of Italy was under the control of Nazi Germany, as was most of the country. The railway between Ancona and Pescara was important for moving German troops and supplies. The British wanted to disrupt the railway without using large forces. Operation Candytuft was to work alongside Operation Saxifrage in the same area.

== Objectives ==
The main objective of the operation was to derail a train on the railway between Ancona and Pescara. There were also several secondary objectives, including blowing gaps in the railway line in front and behind the train, mining the main coastal road to further disrupt traffic, and cutting telephone and power lines to hamper German communications. Even if the derailment failed, the secondary objectives were to be carried out.

== Forces Involved ==
The forces involved on the British side included 16 men from the 2nd Special Air Service (SAS). The men were divided into four four-man teams, with three from D Squadron and one from B Squadron, and was commanded by Major Roy Farran. The Germans had an unknown number of soldiers in the area, and a U-boat was anchored at the mouth of the Tronto River.

== Planning and Insertion ==
In order to deliver the men to their landing point, naval transport was needed. The type of craft chosen was motor torpedo boats (MTBs) to minimise detection and allow for a fast extraction. The landing point was to be near the mouth of the Tronto River, south of Ancona. The plan was to ferry the troops from the MTB’s to shore in small boats to further avoid detection. The insertion was scheduled to take place in the late evening on 27th October at 22:00 hours. After landing, the teams were to move several kilometres inland and hide during the daylight hours. The teams were then required to rendezvous at a specific point on the railway line before attempting the sabotage. Naval forces offshore were also instructed to monitor the coastline for extraction signals.

== Execution ==
During the operation, the SAS teams successfully landed on the night of 27-28 October, and moved 4-5 miles (6-8 kilometers) inland along the southern bank of the Tronto River, avoiding detection and reaching their hiding spots. The four teams operated independently, but all followed the same overall plan. Poor weather conditions made coordination difficult, but the teams moved towards the railway line on the appointed time. Explosives were placed at points along the tracks, the coastal road was mined and telephone and power lines were cut.

== Outcome and Extraction ==
The demolition charges exploded and caused significant damage to German transport infrastructure. The railway line was destroyed in several locations, disrupting rail traffic. The mining of the coastal road further hindered movement, while German communications were affected by the cutting of telephone and power lines. Two SAS personnel were captured by German forces, but the remaining 14 successfully avoided detection and moved south towards the pre-designated extraction area. The men again hid during daylight hours and moved at night to avoid patrols, while naval forces monitored the coast-line for pre-arranged torch signals. In the end, the majority of the SAS force was successfully extracted by motor torpedo boats.

== Aftermath ==
Operation Candytuft successfully demonstrated the effectiveness of small SAS sabotage teams, as well as disrupting German transportation along the Adriatic coast at a critical time in the Italian campaign. Damage to the railway and road infrastructure forced the Germans to divert much needed resources to repair and heightened security. The operation also showed the potential of naval and SAS teams working in conjunction. Despite the capture of two SAS personnel, the operation was considered a tactical success, and contributed to the growing reputation of the Special Air Service in WWII.

== See also ==
- Operation Saxifrage, run at the same time as Operation Candytuft
