= Club Run =

Operations to supply Malta during World War II

- Part of The Mediterranean campaign of the Second World War
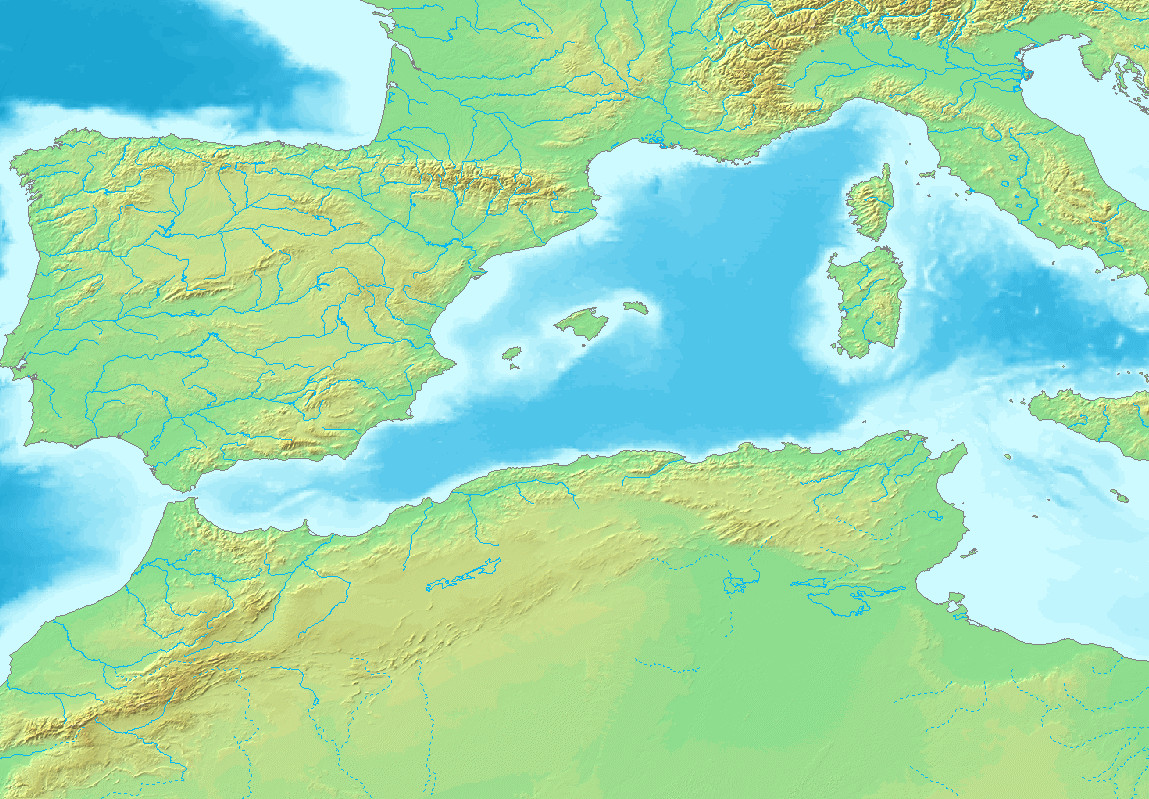
- Map of the Western Mediterranean
- Type: Aircraft ferry operations
- Location: Western Mediterranean
- Planned by: Royal Navy and Royal Air Force
- Commanded by: Admiral James Somerville (July 1940 – March 1942); Vice-Admiral Edward Syfret (March 1942 – 1943)
- Objective: Deliver aircraft to Malta
- Outcome: Allied victory

Club Run was an informal name for aircraft ferry operations from Gibraltar to Malta during the Siege of Malta from 1940 to 1942 during the Second World War. Malta was half-way between Gibraltar and Alexandria and had the only harbour controlled by the British in the area. Malta had docks, repair facilities, reserves and stores, that had been built up since the cession of the island to Britain in 1814. Malta had become an important staging post for aircraft and a base for air reconnaissance over the central Mediterranean.

The Axis powers Italy and Germany made several attempts from 1941 to 1942 to force the British military authorities on the island to surrender or to destroy its effectiveness as a military base from which Axis supply ships to their North African armies could be attacked. It is a measure of Malta's importance that Britain reassigned fighter aircraft from home defence.

== Background ==
=== Force H ===
Ferry missions were covered by Force H, based at Gibraltar (called The Club), consisting of the battlecruiser HMS Renown, aircraft carrier HMS Ark Royal, light cruiser HMS Sheffield and the E and F-class destroyers of the 8th Destroyer Flotilla. Its Malta supply operations were called Club Runs. It was deemed to be an exclusive club of the most efficient warships in the Royal Navy. A mythical "regimental tie" was designed for members of "The Club", consisting of a Mediterranean grey field, scattered with raspberries.

=== Malta ===
Malta's air defences were essential, replacement aircraft and reinforcements were always needed. Fighters (Hurricanes and Spitfires) and torpedo bombers (Swordfish and Albacores) lacked the range to fly direct from the British base at Gibraltar. The solution was for aircraft carriers to sail close enough to Malta for the fighters to fly to Malta.

== Prelude ==
=== British strategy ===
At the outbreak of war, the opinion of the chiefs of staff was that Malta was indefensible and this view was supported by a later review, "there is nothing practicable that we can do to increase the powers of resistance of Malta". Winston Churchill disagreed. In July 1940, he insisted that Hurricanes be flown in "at the earliest moment". This led to the first Club Run, Operation Hurry, using the ageing aircraft carrier HMS Argus. Additional capacity was created by transporting aircraft in crates and assembling them at Gibraltar or on board carriers, one ferry run from Britain delivering enough aircraft for two Club Runs.

=== Axis strategy ===
The Regia Aeronautica and the Luftwaffe sought to attack the aircraft while in transit and catch them on the ground before they could be armed and refuelled. Forty of the Spitfires delivered by the United States Navy carrier USS Wasp in Operation Calendar were destroyed on the ground but in the following operation Operation Bowery the Axis air forces were outwitted by getting the Spitfires airborne and waiting for the Axis aircraft before they arrived.

=== 1942 ===
From early 1942, Spitfires were necessary to counter the more modern Axis fighters. There were faults with the new external 90-gallon external (slipper) tanks that were needed to give Spitfires enough range and two Club Runs were cancelled. After modifications to the slipper tanks at Gibraltar the operations were run again. Calendar delivered inadequately prepared aircraft that were caught on the ground at Malta and the 64 Spitfires delivered by Bowery required adaptations to the slipper tanks while on board USS Wasp. The failure to rectify a fault over several deliveries in such desperate circumstances is unexplained but was described as "embarrassing".

== Club Runs ==
=== 1940–1941 ===
Club Runs to Malta, 1940–1941
Date	Operation	Carrier	Aircraft	Notes
2 August 1940	Hurry	Argus	12 Hurricanes	12 arrived
17 November	White	Argus	12 Hurricanes	4 arrived, 7 pilots lost
3 April 1941	Winch	Ark Royal	12 Hurricanes	All arrived
27 April	Dunlop	Ark Royal	24 Hurricanes	23 arrived
21 May	Splice	Ark Royal, Furious	48 Hurricanes	46 arrived
6 June	Rocket	Ark Royal, Furious	44 Hurricanes	43 arrived
14 June	Tracer	Ark Royal, Victorious	48 Hurricanes	45 arrived
27 June	Railway I	Ark Royal	22 Hurricanes	21 arrived
30 June	Railway II	Ark Royal, Furious	42 Hurricanes	34 arrived
25 July	Substance	Ark Royal	7 Swordfish	All arrived
9 September	Status I	Ark Royal	14 Hurricanes	All arrived
13 September	Status II	Ark Royal, Furious	46 Hurricanes	45 arrived
18 October	Callboy	Ark Royal	11 Albacores	All arrived
12 November	Perpetual	Argus, Ark Royal	2 Swordfish, 37 Hurricanes	1 Swordfish, 34 Hurricanes arrived
14 Club Runs			Dispatched: 361 Hurricanes; 9 Swordfish; 11 Albacores (381)	Arrived: 333 Hurricanes; 8 Swordfish; 11 Albacores (352)

=== 1942 ===
Club Runs to Malta, 1942
Date	Operation	Carrier	Aircraft	Notes
February	Spotter	Eagle	15 Spitfire Mk Vb	Aborted, faulty fuel tanks
March	Spotter II	Eagle	15 Spitfire Mk Vb	Second ferry attempt, success
March	Picket	Eagle	9 Spitfire Mk Vb	Aborted, fuel tank fault
27 March	Picket II	Eagle, Argus	7 Spitfire Mk Vb	6 Albacores unable to fly off Argus
April	Calendar	Wasp	52 Spitfires	4 u/s, 47 arrived (Note: Most of these aircraft were destroyed on the ground.)
April	Bowery	Wasp, Eagle	64 Spitfires	61 arrived (Note: Most of these aircraft were destroyed on the ground.)
17–19 May	LB	Eagle	17 Spitfires, 6 Albacores	Albacores returned, engine failure
3 June	Style	Eagle	31 Spitfires	28 arrived (Note: one crashed on take-off, the pilot being rescued, three shot down en route by bf 110 fighters from Pantellaria.)
8–10 June	Salient	Eagle	32 Spitfires	
14–16 July	Pinpoint	Eagle	32 Spitfires	31 arrived (Note: One Spitfire had engine failure on take-off and was dumped over the side.)
20–22 July	Insect	Eagle	30 Spitfires	28 arrived (Note: One found to be u/s and retained, one Spitfire had a defective fuel tank, the pilot bailed out but the parachute failed to open.)
August	Bellows	Furious	39 Spitfires	
28–30 October	Baritone	Furious	32 Spitfires	
October	Train	Furious	29 Spitfires	

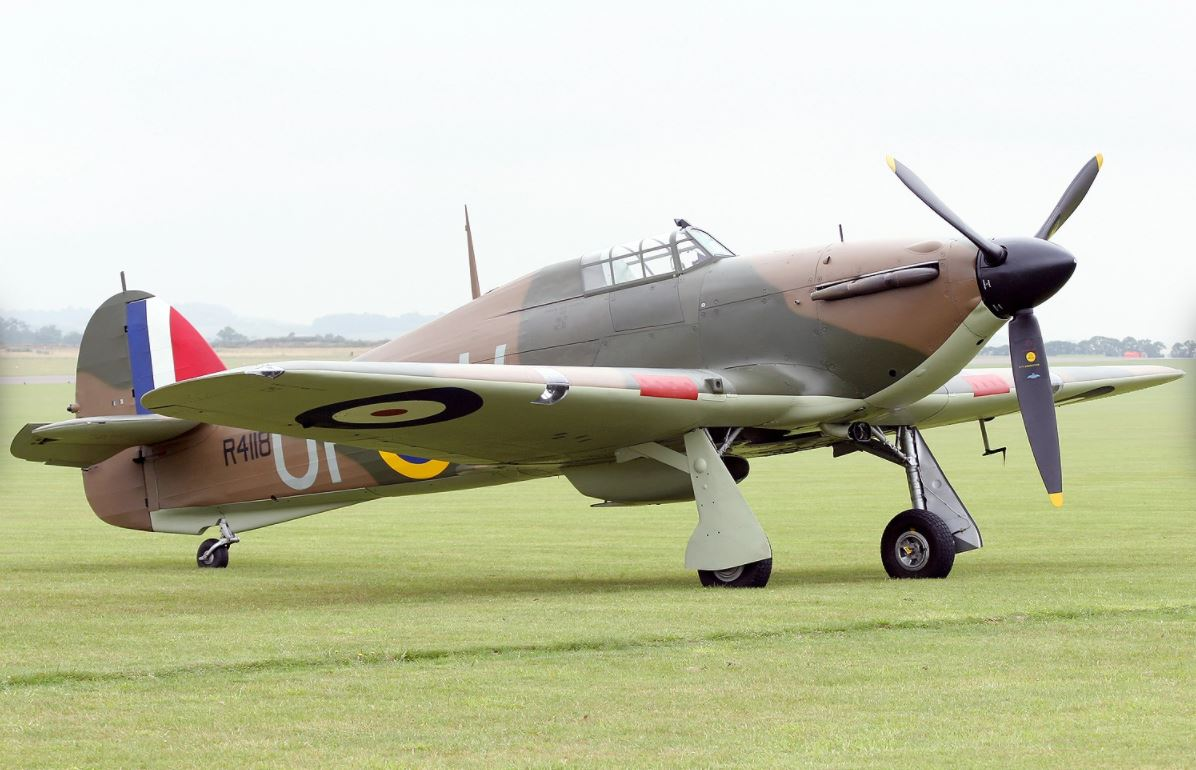
Hawker Hurricane Mk I

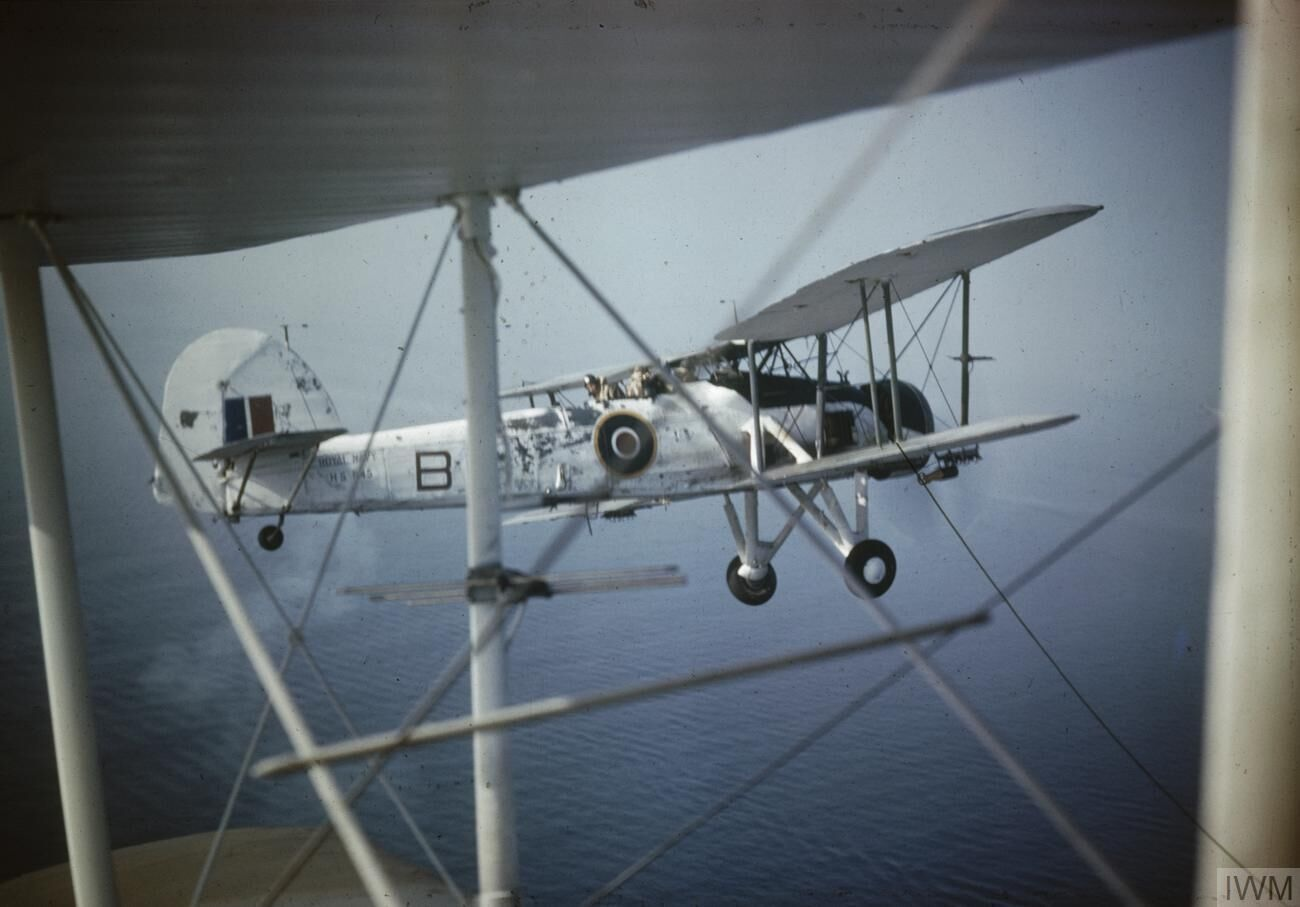
Fairey Swordfish in flight

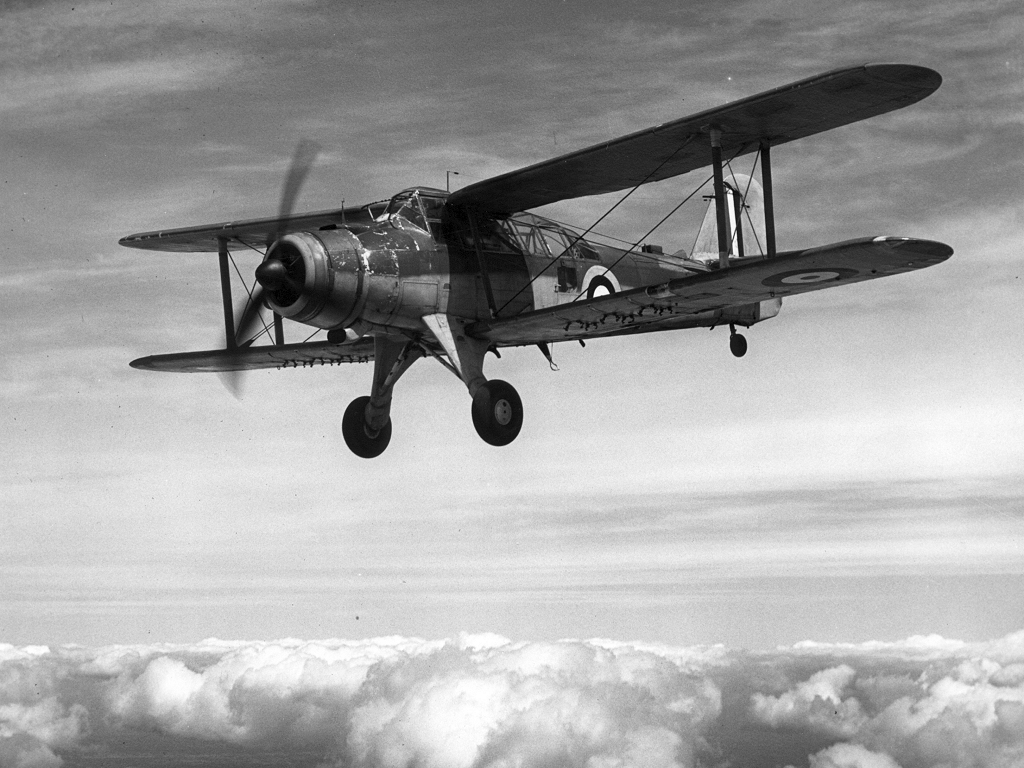
Fairey Albacore in flight

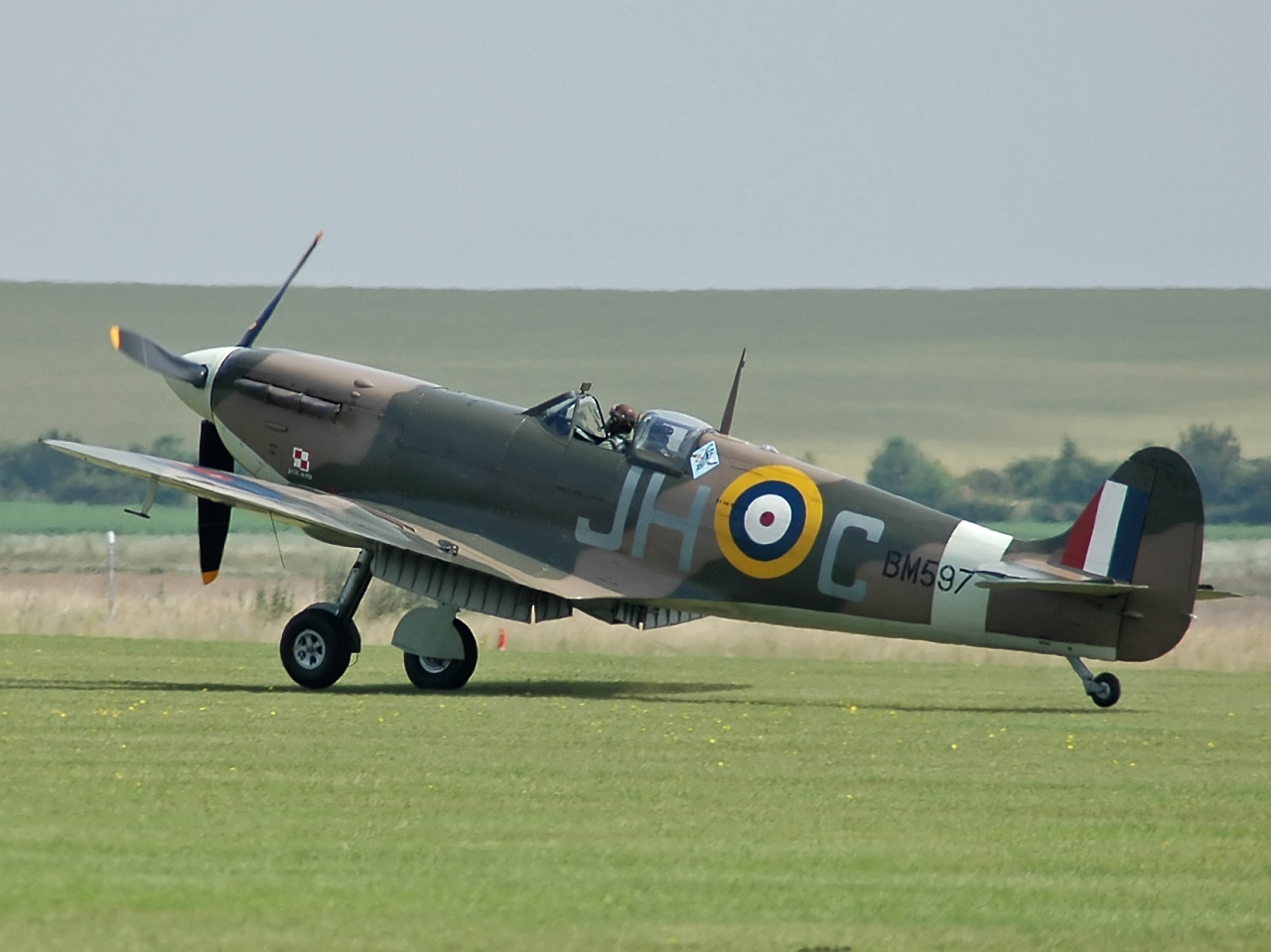
Spitfire F Mk Vb

=== Club Runs end ===
From October 1942, Spitfire Mk VCs with additional internal and external fuel tanks and most armament removed were capable of flying the 1,100 mi (1,800 km) from Gibraltar to Malta, where the adaptations were reversed, which made Club Runs redundant.

== See also ==
- Malta Convoys
- Siege of Malta (World War II)

== Bibliography ==
- Playfair, Major-General I. S. O.; et al. (1954). Butler, J. R. M. (ed.). The Mediterranean and Middle East: The Early Successes Against Italy (to May 1941). History of the Second World War, United Kingdom Military Series. Vol. I. HMSO. OCLC 494123451.
- Roskill, S. W. (1957) [1954]. Butler, J. R. M. (ed.). The War at Sea 1939–1945: The Defensive. History of the Second World War United Kingdom Military Series. Vol. I (4th impr. ed.). London: HMSO. OCLC 881709135.
- Shores, Christopher; Cull, Brian; Malizia, Nicola (1987). Malta: The Hurricane Years 1940–41. London: Grub Street. ISBN 0-948817-06-2.
- Smith, Peter C. (2009) [1995]. Eagle's War: Aircraft Carrier HMS Eagle 1939–1942 (2nd pbk. ed.). Manchester: Crécy Publishing. ISBN 978-0-9075795-3-3.
- Woodman, Richard (2000). Malta Convoys 1940–1943. London: John Murray. ISBN 978-0-7195-6408-6.
- Woodman, Richard (2003). Malta Convoys 1940–1943 (pbk. repr. ed.). London: John Murray. ISBN 0-7195-6408-5.
