= List of aircraft carrier operations during World War II =

Naval historians such as Evan Mawdsley, Richard Overy, and Craig Symonds concluded that World War II's decisive victories on land could not have been won without decisive victories at sea. Naval battles to keep shipping lanes open for combatant's movement of troops, guns, ammunition, tanks, warships, aircraft, raw materials, and food largely determined the outcome of land battles. Without the Allied victory in keeping shipping lanes open during the Battle of the Atlantic, Britain could not have fed her people or withstood Axis offensives in Europe and North Africa. Without Britain's survival and without Allied shipments of food and industrial equipment to the Soviet Union, (Note: Britain and America shipped war-sustaining goods to the Soviet Union via Arctic Ocean, Persian Gulf, and Pacific Ocean routes.) her military and economic power would likely not have rebounded in time for Russian soldiers to prevail at Stalingrad and Kursk.

Without victories at sea in the Pacific theater, the Allies could not have mounted amphibious assaults on or maintained land forces on Guadalcanal, New Guinea, Saipan, The Philippines, Iwo Jima, or Okinawa. Allied operations in the Atlantic and Pacific war theaters were interconnected because they frequently competed for scarce naval resources for everything from aircraft carriers to transports and landing craft. Effective transport of troops and military supplies between the two war theaters required naval protection for shipping routes around the Cape of Good Hope, through the Suez canal, and through the Panama Canal. In both theaters, maritime dominance enabled combatants to use the sea for their own purposes and deprive its use by adversaries. As naval historian Admiral Herbert Richmond stated, "Sea power did not win the war itself: it enabled the war to be won".

Aircraft carriers played a major role in winning decisive naval battles, supporting key amphibious landings, and keeping critical merchant shipping lanes open for transporting military personnel and their equipment to land battle zones. This article is part of a series that covers World War II from the vantage point of aircraft carrier operations and is focused upon names and dates for operations involving aircraft carriers.

== List of named operations involving aircraft carriers ==
This a chronological list of named operations involving aircraft carriers combining USN, RN, and IJN operations for Atlantic and Pacific theaters. Dates are for carrier involvement, not necessarily the dates for the entire operation.

Named World War II military operations involving aircraft carriers
Name	Navy	Action	Begin	End	Task Force	Carriers
1940
Hurry	RN	Deliver Aircraft to Malta	31 July 1940	4 August 1940	Force H	Argus, Ark Royal
Hat	RN	Reinforce Eastern Mediterranean Fleet; Deliver Supplies to Malta	30 August 1940	5 September 1940	Force H & Force F	Ark Royal, Illustrious
Coat	RN	Deliver Aircraft to Malta	November 1940	November 1940	Force H	Argus, Ark Royal, Illustrious
FU	IJN	Invasion of French Indochina	22 September 1940	26 September 1940	CarDiv2	Soryu, Hiryu
Judgment	RN	Raid on Taranto, Italy	11 November 1940	12 November 1940	Force H	Illustrious
1941
Express	RN	Convoys to Malta, Greece, & Egypt	10 January 1941	11 January 1941	Force A	Illustrious
Grog	RN	Raids on Genoa and La Spezia, Italy	9 February 1941	9 February 1941	Force H	Ark Royal
11 "Club Runs"	RN	Deliver Aircraft to Malta	April 1941	October 1941	Force H	Ark Royal, Furious, Victorious
EF	RN	Raid on Kirkenes, Norway and Petsamo, Finland	30 July 1941	30 July 1941		Victorious, Furious
Halberd	RN	Escort Convoy to Malta	27 September 1941	27 September 1941	Force H	Ark Royal
Perpetual	RN	Deliver Aircraft to Malta	11 October 1941	12 October 1941	Force H	Argus, Ark Royal (sunk)
AI	IJN	Raid on Pearl Harbor	7 December 1941	7 December 1941	Kido Butai	Akagi, Kaga, Sōryū, Hiryū, Shōkaku, Zuikaku
M	IJN	Invasion of the Philippines	8 December 1941	20 December 1941		Ryūjō
1942
R	IJN	Invasion of Rabaul and Kavieng	4 January 1942	February 1942		Akagi, Kaga, Shōkaku, Zuikaku
H	IJN	Invasion of Ambon and Timor	30 January 1942	3 February 1942	CarDiv2	Soryu, Hiryu
14 "Club Runs"	RN	Deliver Aircraft to Malta	February 1942	October 1942	Force H	HMS Eagle, HMSArgus, HMS Furious, USS Wasp
Revenge	USN	Raids on Kwajalein, Wotje, and Maloelap, Marshall Islands	1 February 1942	February 1942	TF-8	Enterprise, Yorktown
J	IJN	Invasion of Java, NEI)	14 February 1942	27 February 1942		Ryūjō
L, T	IJN	Invasion of Sumatra, NEI)	14 February 1942	28 March 1942		Ryūjō
Revenge 3	USN	Raid on Lae & Salamaua	10 March 1942	10 March 1942	TF-11	Lexington, Yorktown
D	IJN	Invasion of the Andaman Islands	23 March 1942	23 March 1942	CarDiv4	Ryūjō
C	IJN	Indian Ocean raid	31 March 1942	10 April 1942	Kido Butai	Akagi, Sōryū, Hiryū, Shōkaku, Zuikaku
Mo	IJN	Planned Invasion of Port Moresby, New Guinea	4 April 1942	8 April 1942	?	Shōkaku, Zuikaku, Shōhō
Shangri-la	USN	Doolittle Raid on Tokyo	18 April 1942	18 April 1942	TF-18,16	Hornet, Enterprise
Calendar	RN	Deliver Aircraft to Malta	20 April 1942	20 April 1942	Force W	USS Wasp
Bowery	RN	Deliver Aircraft to Malta	9 May 1942	9 May 1942	Force W	USS Wasp, HMS Eagle
AL	IJN	Invasion of Aleutian Islands	3 June 1942	15 August 1943		Ryūjō , Jun'yō
MI	IJN	Battle of Midway	4 June 1942	7 June 1942	Kido Butai	Akagi, Kaga, Sōryū, Hiryū
Pedestal	RN	Convoy from Gibraltar to Malta	3 August 1942	15 August 1942	Force F?	Victorious, Eagle (sunk), Indomitable
Watchtower	USN	Invasion of Guadalcanal	7 August 1942	9 February 1943	TF-11, 16, 18	Saratoga, Enterprise, Wasp
Ka	IJN	Battle of the Eastern Solomons	24 August 1942	25 August 1942		Shōkaku, Zuikaku, Ryūjō
?	IJN	Battle of the Santa Cruz Islands	25 October 1942	27 October 1942	?	Shōkaku, Zuikaku, Zuihō, Junyo (Hiyo)
Torch	USN/RN	Invasion of French North Africa	8 November 1942	16 November 1942	TF-38, ?	USS Ranger, Sangamon, Suwannee, Chenango, Santee, HMS Victorious, Formidable, Furious, Argus, Avenger, Biter, Dasher
1943
Ke	IJN	Evacuation of Guadalcanal	14 January 1943	7 February 1943		Zuikaku, Zuihō. Junyo
I-Go	IJN	Raids Against Allied Advances in Solomons & New Guinea	1 April 1943	19 April 1943	CarDiv 1, 2	Zuikaku, Zuihō, Junyo, Hiyo
Toenails	USN	Invasion of New Georgia	26 June 1943	25 August 1943	TG-36.3	USS Saratoga, HMS Victorious
Husky	RN/USN	Invasion of Sicily	9 July 1943	16 July 1943	Allied	HMS Indomitable. Formidable
Cherryblossem	USN	Invasion of Bougainville	21 October 1943	11 November 1943	TF-38, TG 50.3	Saratoga, Princeton, Essex, Bunker Hill, Independence
Galvanic	USN	Invasion of Tarawa & Makin, Gilbert Islands	18 November 1943	23 November 1943	TG-50.4	6 CV, 5 CVL, 8 CVE
1944
Flintlock	USN	Invasion of Kwajalein Atoll, Marshall Islands	27 January 1944	2 February 1944	TF-58	6 CV, 6 CVL, 8 CVE
Catchpole	USN	Invasion of Eniwetok Atoll, Marshall Islands	13 February 1944	28 February 1944	TF-58	1 CV, 2 CVL, 3 CVE (USS Saratoga, Princeton, Langley, Sangamon, Suwannee, Chenango)
Hailstone	USN	Raid on Truk, Caroline Islands	17 February 1944	18 February 1944	TF-58	5 CV, 4 CVL (USS Enterprise, Yorktown, Essex, Intrepid, Bunker Hill, Belleau Wood, Cabot, Cowpens, Monterey)
Desecrate 1	USN	Raids on Palau Islands	30 March 1944	31 March 1944	TF-58	5 CV, 6 CVL (USS Enterprise, Yorktown, Lexington, Hornet, Bunker Hill, Belleau Wood, Cowpens, Cabot, Monterey, Princeton, Langley)
Tungsten	RN	Raid on battleship Tirpitz at Kaafjord, Norway	3 April 1944	3 April 1944	Force 1, 2	Victorious, Furious, 4 CVE (Emperor, Pursuer, Searcher, Fencer)
Cockpit	RN	Raid on Sabang, Sumatra, Netherlands East Indies	19 April 1944	19 April 1944	BEF/70	HMS Illustrious, USS Saratoga
Reckless	USA	Invasion of Hollandia, New Guinea	22 April 1944	26 April 1944	TF-58	Enterprise, 8 CVE
Persecution	USA	Invasion of Aitape, New Guinea	22 April 1944	4 May 1944	TF-58	Enterprise
Ridge Able	RN	Raid on German Shipping off Norway	26 April 1944	26 April 1944		CVE Emperor
Croquet	RN	Raid on German Shipping off Norway	6 May 1944	6 May 1944		Furious, CVE Searcher
Hoops	RN	Raid on German Shipping off Norway	8 May 1944	8 May 1944		3 CVE (Searcher, Striker, Emperor
Transom	RN	Raid on Surabaya, Java	17 May 1944	17 May 1944	BEF/70	HMS Illustrious, USS Saratoga
Wanderers	RN	Diversion to keep U-boats away from Normandy	June 1944	June 1944		2 CVE (Fencer, Striker)
Neptune	RN	Prevent U-boat activity at Normandy	June 1944	June 1944		3 CVE (Emperor, Tracker, Pursuer)
Forager	USN	Invasion of Mariana Islands	June 1944			7 CV, 8 CVL, 14 CVE
A-Go	IJN	Defense of the Mariana Islands	19 June 1944	20 June 1944		9 carriers
Anvil/Dragoon	USN	Invasion of Southern France	15 August 1944	14 September 1944	TF-88	9 CVE (7 UK, 2 US)
Outing I	RN	Raids on Axis Shipping in the Aegean	9 September 1944	9 September 1944		4 UK CVE?
Stalemate II	USN	Invasion of Peleliu, Paulus Islands	15 September 1944	27 November 1944	TF-38, 32	3 CV, 5 CVL,11 CVE
Lycidas	RN	Minelaying off Norway	15 October 1944	15 October 1944		2 CVE (Fencer, Trumpeter)
??Forager	USN	Invasion of Palaus Islands	June 1944	November 1944?		
King II	USN	Invasion of Leyte, Philippines	17 October 1944	26 December 1944	TF-38	8 CV, 8 CVL, 18 CVE
Sho-Go	IJN	Defense of Philippines	23 October 1944	26 October 1944		
Love III	USN	? Strikes on Luzon and Mindoro Landing	25 November 1944	? December 1944	TF-38	?
1945
Meridian	RN	Raid on Palembang, Sumatra	24 January 1945	29 January 1945	BPF/Force 63	Illustrious, Indefatigable, Indomitable, Victorious
Mike I	USN	Invasion of Lingayen Gulf, Philippines	9 January 1945	?	TF-38	?
Jamboree	USN	Raids on Tokyo	16 February 1945	26 February 1945	TF-58	11 CV, 5 CVL,
Detachment	USN	Invasion of Iwo Jima, Vulcano Islands	19 February 1945	26 March 1945	TF-58, 50	12 CV, 5 CVL, 9 CVE
Iceberg	USN	Invasion of Okinawa	1 April 1945	22 June 1945		
Teardrop	USN	Anti-sub US east coast	April 1945	May 1945		4 CVE

== Aircraft carriers at specific battles, invasions, and raids ==
Aircraft carriers were involved in many attacks and support activities in addition to the better known major carrier battles. The more complete list below includes battles, invasions, and raids and names the specific carriers involved. "Naval battle" refers to a naval engagement entirely on water, "invasion" refers to an operation involving amphibious landing of troops to occupy land areas, and "raid" refers to attacks without the intention to occupy the land areas involved. Also included in the list are some transport, convoy escort, and antisubmarine warfare operations.

[INVOLVEMENT OF ESCORT CARRIERS REPORTED BY Y'BLOOD HAS NOT YET BEEN COMPLETELY INCLUDED IN THE LIST BELOW]

=== 1932 ===
IJN Support for IJA Shanghai Incident (28 Jan – 3 March 1932) First IJN aerial combat IJN 3rd Fleet/1st Carrier Division (Nomura):

- IJN Hōshō (CVL)
- IJN Kaga (CV)

=== 1937 ===
IJN Support for IJA Battle of Shanghai (14–16 August 1937) IJN 3rd Fleet, 1st & 4th Carrier Divisions (3 carriers, 90 aircraft):

- IJN Hōshō (CVL)
- IJN Kaga (CV)
- IJN Ryūjō (CVL)

IJN Attack on USS Panay (12 December 1937) During "Rape of Nanking"

- IJN Kaga (CV)

=== 1938 ===
IJN Support for IJA Invasion of Guangdong (12 Oct – 31 December 1938)

- IJN Kaga (CV)
- IJN Ryūjō (CVL)
- IJN Soryu (CV)

=== 1939 ===
IJN Support for IJA Operations against China (30 Jan – 19 February 1939)

- IJN Akagi (CV)

=== 1940 ===
INJ Support for IJA Operations against China (27 Mar – 2 April 1940)

- IJN Akagi (CV)

RN Escort for Convoy US-3 transporting Australian and New Zealand Troops to the UK (mid June 1940) •HMS Argus (CV-I49)

RN Battle of Calabria (9 July 1940)

RN Force C (Cunningham):

- HMS Eagle (CV, 94)

RN Delivery of Aircraft to Malta (31 July – 4 August 1940) Operation HURRY (a "Club Run")

RN Force H:

- HMS Argus (CV, I49) 12 Hawker Hurricanes reached Malta
- HMS Ark Royal (CV, 91) Attacked Cagliari

RN Delivery of Aircraft to Gold Coast (Aug – September 1940) • HMS Argus (CV-I49)

IJN Support for IJA invasion of French Indochina (22–26 September 1940) Operation FU

IJN 2nd Fleet, 2nd Carrier Division:

- IJN Soryu (CV)
- IJN Hiryu (CV)

RN Search for Raiders including Kriegsmarine pocket battleship Admiral Graf Spee in the Indian Ocean (Sept – December 1940)

RN Force I:

- HMS Eagle (CV, 94)

RN Delivery of Aircraft for Raid on Taranto (Nov 1940) Operation Coat (a "Club Run")

RN Force H:

- HMS Ark Royal (CV, 91)) delivered 3 Fulmars to HMS Illustrious
- HMS Illustrious (CV, 87)

RN Raid on Taranto, Italy (11–12 November 1940) Operation JUDGMENT

RN Force H (Cunningham)

- HMS Illustrious (CV, 87) Air Squadron 815

RN Delivery of Aircraft to Malta (17 November 1940) Operation Operation White (a "Club Run")

RN Force H:

- HMS Argus (CV, I49) 12 Hurricane fighters launched, 4 arrived at Malta

RN Battle of Cape Spartivento (27 November 1940)

RN Force H:

- HMS Ark Royal (CV, 91)

RN Delivery of Aircraft to Gibraltar (Dec 1940) • HMS Argus (CV-I49) aircraft transferred to HMS Ark Royal for delivery to Malta

RN Delivery of Aircraft to Gibraltar (mid-Dec 1940) rendezvoused with Convoy WS-5A • HMS Argus (CV-I49) attacked by Kriegsmarine Admiral Hipper (25 December 1940) • HMS Furious (CV, 47)

=== 1941 ===
Information for this section was obtained from online ship histories, principally from the following sources:

1. Dictionary of American Naval Fighting Ships
2. Royal and Dominion Navy Warships
3. Imperial Japanese Navy Page
4. Naval War In The Pacific 1941–1945
5. World War II Database

RN Convoys to Malta, Greece, and Egypt (10–11 January 1941) Operation EXPRESS

RN Force A:

- HMS Illustrious (CV, 67) damaged by 5 Luftwaffe bombs

RN Raid on Genoa and La Spezia, Italy (9 February 1941)

RN Force H:

- HMS Ark Royal (CV, 91)

IJN Support for IJA Blockade of Southern China (Feb 1941)

IJN 2nd Fleet, 2nd Carrier Division:

- IJN Soryu (CV)
- IJN Hiryu (CV)

RN Battle of Cape Matapan (27–29 March 1941)

RN Force H- Mediterranean Fleet (Cunningham): • HMS Formidable (CV/67)

RN Eleven Deliveries of Aircraft, Troops, and Supplies to Malta (Apr – October 1941) Operations WINCH, DUNLOP, SPLICE, ROCKET, TRACER, RAILWAY I & II, STATUS I & II, CALLBOY, and SUBSTANCE ("Club Runs")

RN Force H:

- HMS Ark Royal (CV, 91)
- HMS Furious (CV, 47)
- HMS Victorious (CV, 38)

USN Atlantic Patrols and Convoy Escort (Apr – December 1941)

- USS Yorktown (CV-5)

RN Convoy escort to/from Gibraltar (Sept – December 1941) Convoys OG74, HG74, OG76, HG76

RN:

- HMS Audacity (CVE/D10) Sunk off Gibraltar by U-751 12/2/41

RN Convoy to Malta (27 September 1941) Operation HALBERD

RN Force H:

- HMS Ark Royal (CV, 91)

IJN Transport Fighter Aircraft to Formosa and Palau ( Oct – December 1941)

- IJN Taiyo (CVE)

RN Delivery of Aircraft to Malta (11–12 Nov) Operation PERPETUAL

RN Force H:

- HMS Ark Royal (CV, 91) sunk by single torpedo on return passage

IJN Raid on Pearl Harbor (Dec 7 1941) Operation AI

IJN 1st Air Fleet/Kido Butai/Carrier Divisions 1, 2, and 5 (Nagumo):

- IJN Akagi (CV)
- IJN Kaga (CV)
- IJN Soryu (CV)
- IJN Hiryu (CV)
- IJN Shōkaku (CV) two strikes
- IJN Ziukaku (CV) two strikes

IJN Main Body/3rd Carrier Division (distant cover):

- IJN Hōshō (CVL)

Note: At the time of the attack, only three of the seven USN fleet carriers were in the Pacific theater. USS Saratoga was near San Diego CA following refitting at Bremerton WA. USS Lexington was ferrying aircraft to Midway Island. USS Enterprise was 200 miles west of Hawaii, returning from Wake Island.

IJN Protection for 1st Air Fleet Returning Home From Pearl Harbor Raid (Dec 8 1941) IJN Main Body/3rd Carrier Division (distant cover):

- IJN Hōshō (CV)
- IJN Zuihō (CVL)

IJN Invasion of Wake Island (7–23 December 1941)

- IJN Sōryū (CV)
- IJN Hiryū (CV)

USN Relief of Wake Island (8 December 1941) Operation cancelled Dec 22 (or 23?) US Task Forces 11 (Brown) and 14:

- USS Lexington (CV-2)
- USS Saratoga (CV-3) Squadron VMF-221 to Midway Island instead.

IJN Invasion of Davao & Jolo, Mindanao, Philippines (8–20 December 1941) Operation M

- IJN Ryūjō (CVL)

USN convoy escort to Newfoundland (Dec 1942)

USN:

- USS Long Island (CVE-1)

=== 1942 ===
Information for this section was obtained from online ship histories, principally from the following sources:

1. Dictionary of American Naval Fighting Ships
2. Royal and Dominion Navy Warships
3. Imperial Japanese Navy Page
4. Naval War In The Pacific 1941–1945
5. World War II Database

IJN Invasion of Malay Peninsula (Jan 1942)

- IJN Ryūjō (CVL)

IJN Invasion of Rabaul and Kavieng, Raids on Lae, Salamaua, Bulolo, and Madang (4 Jan – February 1942) Operation R

IJN 1st & 5th Carrier Divisions:

- IJN Akagi (CV)
- IJN Kaga (CV)
- IJN Shōkaku (CV) raids on Lae, Salamaua, Bulolo, and Madang
- IJN Ziukaku (CV) raids on Lae, Salamaua, Bulolo, and Madang

USN Patrols around Midway Island (Jan 1942)

US Task Force 14:

- USS Saratoga (CV-3) damaged by torpedo from I-6
- USS Enterprise?

IJN Invasion of Ambon (30 Jan – 3 February 1942) Operation H

IJN Second Carrier Division (Takahashi):

- IJN Soryu (CV)
- IJN Hiryu (CV)

RN 14 Deliveries of Aircraft, Troops, and Supplies to Malta (Feb – October 1942) Operations SPOTTER I & II, PICKET I & II, CALENDAR, BOWERY, LB, STYLE, SALIENT, PINPOINT, INSECT, BELLOWS, BARITONE, and TRAIN ("Club Runs")

RN Force H:

- HMS Eagle (CV, 94)
- HMS Argus (CV, I49)
- USS Wasp (CV-7)
- HMS Furious (CV, 47)

USN transport of aircraft and aircrews in Pacific (Feb 1942– September 1945)

USN:

- USS Copahee (CVE-30)

IJN Transport of Aircraft to Philippines (Feb 1942)

- IJN Zuihō (CVL)

USN Raid on Marshall and Gilbert Islands (1 February 1942) [USN Task Forces 8 (Halsey) and 17 (Fletcher): TF-8??? or 16???] USN Task Force 17 (Fletcher):

- USS Yorktown (CV-5)

USN Task Force 16 (?) (Adm ?):

- USS Enterprise (CV-8)

IJN Unsuccessful Pursuit of US Carriers after Raid on Marshall Islands (1 February 1942)

- IJN Akagi (CV)
- IJN Kaga (CV)
- IJN Zuikaku (CV)

IJN Raid on Ships Evacuating Singapore (mid-Feb 1942)

- IJN Ryūjō (CVL) claimed sinking 4 ships and damaging 8 more

IJN Invasion of Java (14–27 February 1942) Operation J

- IJN Ryūjō (CVL) protected troop ships and sank USS Pope

IJN Raid on Darwin, Australia (19 February 1942) IJN 1st Carrier Air Fleet (Nagumo), 1st and 2nd Carrier Divisions (4 carriers, 188 carrier-launched aircraft)

- IJN Akagi (CV)
- IJN Kaga (CV) damaged going aground 9 February 1942 at Palau
- IJN Soryu (CV)
- IJN Hiryu (CV)

IJN Invasion of Christmas Island (Feb – 31 March 1942) IJN 1st Carrier Air Fleet (Nagumo):

- IJN Akagi (CV)
- IJN Kaga (CV)
- IJN Soryu (CV)
- IJN Hiryu (CV)

USN Raids on Wake Island ( 23–24 February 1942) [or was this TF-8??] USN Task Force 16 (Halsey?):

- USS Enterprise (CV-6)

USN Raids on Marcus Islands (3–4 March 1942) [or was this TF-8??] USN Task Force 16 (Halsey?):

- USS Enterprise (CV-6)

IJN Raid on Tjilatjap (5 March 1942) IJN 1st Carrier Air Fleet (Nagumo), 1st and 2nd Carrier Divisions? (4 carriers, 180 carrier-launched aircraft)

- IJN Akagi (CV)
- IJN Kaga (CV)
- IJN Soryu (CV)
- IJN Hiryu (CV)

IJN Unsuccessful Pursuit of US Carriers after Raid on Marcus Islands (6 March 1942)

- IJN Shakaku (CV)

USN Raids on Shipping at Lae and Salamaua (10 March 1942) US Task Forces 11 (Brown):

- USS Lexington (CV-2)

USN Task Force 17 (Fletcher):

- USS Yorktown (CV-5)

IJN Patrols Around Japanese Homeland (11–16 March 1942) IJN Carrier Div 5

- IJN Shakaku (CV)
- IJN Zuikaku (CV)

IJN Invasion of Burma and Andaman Islands (23 March 1942) Operation D

IJN CarDiv4:

- IJN Ryūjō (CVL) Present but did not conduct air operations

IJN Indian Ocean Raid (31 Mar – 10 April 1942) Operation C

First Air Fleet, CarDiv 5, Striking Force, air attack force. IJN Kido Butai (5 carriers, 350 aircraft):

- IJN Akagi (CV)
- IJN Soryu (CV)
- IJN Hiryu (CV)
- IJN Shōkaku (CV)
- IJN Ziukaku (CV)

IJN Raids on Bay of Bengal Shipping (1 April 1942) IJN Malay Force:

- IJN Ryūjō (CVL)

IJN Raids on Indian Coast, Cocanada and Vizagapatam (6 April 1942)

- IJN Ryūjō (CVL)

IJN Raid on Columbo, Cylon (5 April 1942) Operation C

IJN Kido Butai (5 carriers, 350 aircraft):

- IJN Akagi (CV)
- IJN Soryu (CV)
- IJN Hiryu (CV)
- IJN Shōkaku (CV)
- IJN Ziukaku (CV)

RN Force A:

- HMS Indomitable (CV-92)

IJN Raid on Trincomalee, Cylon (9 April 1942)

IJN Kido Butai:

- IJN Akagi (CV)
- IJN Soryu (CV)
- IJN Hiryu (CV) ?
- IJN Shōkaku (CV) participated in sinking HMS Hermes
- IJN Ziukaku (CV) participated in sinking HMS Hermes

USN Raid on Rabaul? (11–12 April 1942) IJN:

- IJN Taiyo (CVE) at Rabaul but not hit

USN Raid on Tokyo (18 April 1942) Doolittle Raid USN Task Force 16 (Mitcher): USN Task Group 16.1:

- USS Enterprise (CV-6)

USN Task Group 16.2:

- USS Hornet (CV-8) launched 16 B-25 bombers; IJN Ryuho in drydock damaged by bombs

IJN Unsuccessful Pursuit Following Doolittle Raid (19 April 1942) IJN Carrier Divisions 1 and 2 and newly completed IJN Shoho:

- IJN Akagi (CV)
- IJN Sōryū (CV)
- IJN Hiryū (CV)
- IJN Shoho (CVL)

RN Delivery of 48 Spitfire Fighters to Malta (20 April 1942) Operation CALENDAR (a "Club Run")

RN Force W:

- USS Wasp (CV-7) Most aircraft immediately destroyed by Luftwaffe

USN Raid on Tulagi and Gavutu (4 May 1942) US Task Force 17 (Fletcher):

- USS Yorktown (CV-5)

USN/IJN Battle of the Coral Sea (4–8 May 1942) IJN Operation MO USN Task Force 44 comprising TF-11 and TF-17?: USN Task Force 11 (Fitch):

- USS Lexington (CV-2) sunk by bombs and torpedoes from Shōkaku

USN Task Force 17 (Fletcher):

- USS Yorktown (CV-5) heavily damaged

IJN Carrier Strike Force (Takagi):

- IJN Shōkaku (CV) heavily damaged by bombs and torpedoes from Lexington and Yorktown aircraft; also experienced excessive loss of flight crews
- IJN Zuikaku (CV) experienced excessive loss of flight crews

IJN Main Body Support Force (Gato):

- IJN Shōhō (CVL) sunk by 13 bombs and 7 aerial torpedoes from Lexington and Yorktown aircraft

RN Deliver 61 Spitfire Fighters to Malta (9 May 1942) Operation BOWERY (a "Club Run")

RN Force W:

- USS Wasp (CV-7)
- HMS Eagle (CV, 94)

IJN Invasion of Aleutian Islands (3–7 June 1942) Alaska; IJN Operation AL IJN 2nd Carrier Strike Force, Carrier Division 4:

- IJN Ryūjō (CVL) one zero captured largely intact by US
- IJN Jun'yō (CVL)

USN/IJN Battle of Midway (4–7 June 1942) IJN Operation MI USN Task Forces 16 (Spruance):

- USS Enterprise (CV-6)
- USS Hornet (CV-7)

USN Task Forces 17 (Fletcher):

- USS Yorktown (CV-5) sunk

IJN First Fleet/Main Force (Yamamoto):

- IJN Hōshō (CVL)

First Carrier Striking Force (Nagumo):

- IJN Akagi (CV) sunk
- IJN Kaga (CV) sunk
- IJN Hiryu (CV) sunk
- IJN Soryu (CV) sunk

Second Fleet/Midway Invasion Force Main Body (Kondo):

- IJN Zuihō (CVL)

USN air cover for Hawaii after battle of Midway (June 1942)

USN:

- USS Long Island (CVE-1)

USN Resupply of Aircraft to Midway Island (22–29 June 1942) USN Task Force 11:

- USS Saratoga (CV-3)

IJN Cover Transport of Aleutian Island Reinforcement and Patrol Against Counter Attack (28 June – 6 July 1942)

- IJN Ryūjō (CVL)
- IJN Zuihō (CVL)
- IJN Zuikaku (CV)
- IJN Jun'yō (CVL)

RN Convoy from Gibraltar to Malta (3–15 August 1942) Operation PEDISTAL

RN Force F (Syfret)

- HMS Victorious (CV, 38)
- HMS Eagle (CV, 94) sunk by torpedo from U-73
- HMS Indomitable (CV, 92) damaged
- HMS Furious (CV, 47) part of sub-operation BELLOWS

USN Invasion of Guadalcanal (7 August 1942) US Operation WATCHTOWER (aka "Operation Shoestring") USN Task Force 61 (Fletcher) USN Task Group 61.1 (Noyes) USN Task Unit 61.1.1 aka Task Force 11:

- USS Saratoga (CV-3)

USN Task Unit 61.1.2 aka Task Force 16:

- USS Enterprise (CV-6)

USN Task Unit 61.1.3 aka Task force 18:

- USS Wasp (CV-7)

USN support for Guadalcanal (20 August 1942)

USN:

- USS Long Island (CVE-1) launched first aircraft to reach Henderson Field

USN/IJN Battle of the Eastern Solomons (23–25 August 1942) IJN Operation Ka US Task Forces 61 (Fletcher? Kinkaid?) Two carriers, 176 aircraft; TF-18 with USS Wasp (CV-7) had been sent to refuel:

- USS Saratoga (CV-3) 74 aircraft
- USS Enterprise (CV-6) 80 aircraft; damaged by 3 bombs from Shōkaku and Zuikaku but reinforced Henderson Field with her aircraft.

IJN Main Body (Nagumo) Three carriers of CarDiv1, 177 aircraft

- IJN Shōkaku (CV) launched two strikes
- IJN Zuikaku (CV) launched two strikes
- IJN Ryūjō (CVL) detached to protect invasion convoy; sunk by bombs and a torpedo from Saratoga aircraft.

IJN Transport of Aircraft to Marshall Islands (27–29 August 1942)

- IJN Taiyo (CVE)

? (Sept 1942)

- USS Saratoga (CV-3) damaged by torpedo from I-26

IJN Transport of Aircraft and Convoy Escort to Truk and Outer Bases (Sept 1942 – February 1944) Note: Some of these carriers were involved in these activities on and off during the period.

- IJN Taiyo (CVE) damaged by torpedo from USS Trout (28 September 1942) and from USS Tunny (9 April 1943) and from USS Cabrilla (24 September 1943). Attacked but not hit by torpedoes from USS Pike (6 August 1943).
- IJN Unyo (CVE) attacked twice but not hit by torpedoes from USS Steelhead (10 July and 4 August 1943)
- IJN Chuyo (CVE) sunk by torpedoes from USS Sailfish (4 December 1943); had made a total of 13 voyages ferrying planes, supplies, and passengers.
- IJN Kaiyo (CVE) attacked but not hit by torpedoes from USS Permit; used during this period for aircraft transport rather than escort duty
- IJN Zuihō (CVL)

IJN Carrier trials and pilot training (Oct 1942 – September 1945)

IJN:

- IJN Hosho (CVL-21)

RN escort for Russian Convoys, Loch Ewe to/from Kola Inlet (9–20 September 1942) Convoys PQ18 and QP14

RN:

- HMS Avenger (BAVG-2/D14) Air Squadrons 802 and 8783

USN aircraft transport to Bermuda (Oct 1942)

USN:

- USN Charger (CVE-30)

USN reinforcement of Guadalcanal's Henderson Field (7–11 October 1942) USN Task Force 63: USN Task Unit 63.8: USN Task Group 63.8.1:

- USS Copahee (CVE-12)

USN raids on Buin (Papua, New Guinea) and Faisi Island (Solomons) (5 October 1942) USN Task Force 17:

- USS Hornet (CV-8) On 13 October 1942, launched Squadron VMF-? for Henderson Field.

USN/IJN Battle of the Santa Cruz Islands (25–27 October 1942) USN Task Forces 61, a combined TF-16 and TF-17: USN Task Force 16:

- USS Enterprise (CV-6) damaged but not disabled

USN Task Force 17 (Kinkaid):

- USS Hornet (CV-8) sunk by bombs and torpedoes

IJN Support Force/Third Fleet Striking Force aka kido butai including CarDiv1 (Nagumo):

- IJN Zuihō (CVL) damaged by two bombs
- IJN Shōkaku (CV) damaged by bombs and out of action for 4 months
- IJN Zuikaku (CV)

IJN Support Force/Second Fleet Advanced Force including CarDiv2 (Kondo):

- IJN Junyo (CVL)
- IJN Hiyo (CVL)

USN/RN Invasion of French North Africa (8–16 November 1942) Operation TORCH

USN Task Force 34 Western Naval Task Force (Hewitt) USN Task Group 34.8 Northern Attack Group-Mehedia/Port Lyatuey (Giffin): USN Air Group:

- USS Sangamon (CVE-26)
- USS Chenango (CVE-28)

USN Task Group 34.9 Center Attack Group- Casablanca (Emmet) USN Air Group:

- USS Ranger (CV-4)
- USS Suwanee (CVE-27)

USN Task Group 34.10 Southern Attack Group- Safi (Davidson) USN Air Group:

- USS Santee (CVE-29)

RN Central Naval Task Force (Troubridge): Oran, Algeria; group shot down five Vichy D520 aircraft;

- HMS Furious (CV/47)
- HMS Biter (BAVG-3/D97) Air Squadron 800;
- HMS Dasher (BAVG-5/D37) Air Squadrons 804 and 891;

RN Eastern Task Force (Burrough): [Algiers, Algeria]

- 2 aircraft carriers

Allied Force ?: to be included above

- HMS Ark Royal
- HMS Avenger (CVE, D14) sunk by torpedo from U-155 covering military convoy MKF1 after TORCH landings 11/15/42

Notes: Source http://www.navweaps.com/index_oob/OOB_WWII_Mediterranean/OOB_WWII_Casablanca.php

USN/IJN Naval Battle of Guadalcanal (12–15 November 1942) US Task Force 16 (Kinkaid)

- USS Enterprise (CV-6) aircraft attacked Japanese battleship Hiei (13 November 1942)

USN Invasions of Solomon Islands (Nov 1942 – June 1943)

- USS Saratoga (CV-3) provided air cover for landings

IJN Support for Reinforcement of Wewak (Dec 1942 – January 1943) IJN Operation MU

- IJN Junyo (CVL)

USN Carrier trials and pilot training (Jan 1942 – September 1945)

USN:

- USS Ranger (CV-4) December 1942 & April 1943 in Atlantic; from January 1944 to September 1945 in Atlantic and Pacific theaters
- USS Long Island (CVE-) from Jan to April 1942 in Atlantic and from September 1942 to June 1943 in Pacific
- USS Charger (CVE-30) from May 1942 to September 1945 in Atlantic
- USS Chenango (CVE-28) from April 1943 to October 1944 in Pacific
- USS Casablanca (CVE-55) from August 1943 to December 1944 in Pacific
- USS Solomons (CVE-67) from November 1943 to September 1945 in Atlantic
- USS Takanis Bay (CVE-89) from March 1944 to September 1945 in Pacific
- USS Tripoli (CVE-64) June & July 1944 in Atlantic; from May to September 1945 in Pacific
- USS Makassar Strait (CVE-91) off and on from July 1944 in Pacific
- USS Wake Island (CVE-65) Sept & October 1944 in Atlantic?; from July to September 1945 in Pacific
- USS Prince William (CVE-31) mostly from October 1944 to April 1945 in Atlantic
- USS Matanikau (CVE-101) from November 1944 to June 1945 in Pacific
- USS Shipley Bay (CVE-85) Feb & March 1945 in Pacific
- USS Commencement Bay from February 1945 to September 1945 in Pacific
- USS Corregidor (CVE-58) from March 1945 to September 1945 in Pacific

USN ? (Dec 1942 – January 1943)

Task Force 65 (Mason):

- USS Nassau (CVE-16)

=== 1943 ===
Information for this section was obtained from online ship histories, principally from the following sources:

1. Dictionary of American Naval Fighting Ships
2. Royal and Dominion Navy Warships
3. Imperial Japanese Navy Page
4. Naval War In The Pacific 1941–1945
5. World War II Database

USN anti-submarine and anti-blockade running patrols in South Atlantic (Jan – 25 July 1943)

USN:

- USS Santee (CVE-29)

RN Escort Russian Convoys to/from Kola Inlet (Jan – February 1943) Convoy JW53

RN:

- HMS Dasher (CVE/BAVG-5/D37) Air Squadrons 816 and 891; major structural damage due to extreme weather;

Battle of Rennell Island (29–30 January 1943) US Task Force 16 (Adm ?):

- USS Enterprise (CV-6) covered retreat of TF-18

USN Task Force 18 (Griffin): Note: Detached and not engaged due to "overly cautious leadership"???

- USS Chenango (CVE-28) Carried VGF-28 and VGS-28.
- USS Suwannee (CVE-27) Carried VGF-27, VGS-27.

IJN Support for Evacuation of Guadalcanal (31 Jan – 9 February 1943) IJN Operation KE

IJN "Forward Force Air Force":

- IJN Zuihō (CVL)
- IJN Zuikaku (CV)
- IJN Junyo (CVL)

USN Task Force 50 Night Strike on Truk (10 February 1943)

USN Task Force 50: USN Task Group 50.9:

- USS Enterprise (CV-6)

RN Convoy Escort from Jamaica (March 1943) Convoy CV1

RN:

- HMS Attacker (CVE/D94) Air Squadron 840

RN Atlantic convoy escort (Mar – November 1943) Convoys ONS4, HX237, SC129, ON207, SC146, and HX265.

RN 7th Support Group:

- HMS Biter (CVE/BAVG-3/D97) Air Squadron 811

IJN Raids against Allied Advances up the Solomons and New Guinea (1–19 April 1943) IJN Operation I-Go

IJN Carrier Division 1:

- IJN Zuikaku (CV)
- IJN Zuihō (CVL)

IJN Carrier Division 2:

- IJN Junyo (CVL)
- IJN Hiyo (CVL)

RN Atlantic Convoy Escort to/from Gibraltar and West Africa (May – July 1943) Convoys OS49/KMS16, OS76, OS46/KMS16, KMS16G, and XK9.

RN:

- HMS Battler (CVE-6/D18)

USN invasion of Attu (11–30 May 1943) USN Operation LANDCRAB

Task Force 51: Task Group 51.1 – Support Group

- USS Nassau (CVE-16) Air Squadrons VC-21, VMO-155

IJN sortie to oppose US recapture of Attu (May 1943) Recalled without engaging.

- IJN Zuikaku (CV)
- IJN Shōkaku (CV)
- IJN Junyo (CVL)
- IJN Hiyo (CVL)

IJN Raid on Milne Bay (14 May 1943) IJN Carrier Division 2:

- IJN Junyo (CVL)
- IJN Hiyo (CVL)

USN Invasion of New Georgia (20 June – 7 October 1943) USN Operation TOENAILS

USN Task Force 36: USN Task Group 36.3:

- USS Saratoga (CV-3)
- HMS Victorious (R-38)

RN/USN Invasion of Sicily (9–16 July 1943) Operation HUSKY

Allied Force (Cunningham):

- HMS Indomitable (CV, 92) damaged by torpedo in Ionian Sea

USN Atlantic convoy escort (25 July – November 1943) Included air cover for USS Iowa carrying President Roosevelt to Casablanca Conference?

USN:

- USS Santee (CVE-29)

IJN Ferry Aircraft to Kwajalein, Kavieng, and Rabaul (July 1943)

- IJN Junyo (CVL)

IJN Ferry Aircraft to Singapore (Aug 1943)

- IJN Junyo (CVL)

RN Trials and training (Aug 1943 – September 1945)

RN:

- HMS Ravager (CVE-24?/D70)
- HMS Pretoria Castle (CVE) formerly an MAC (from January 1944)

USN Task Force 50 (Aug 1943) Raid on Rabaul USN Task Group 50.3

- USN Essex (CV-9)
- USN Bunker Hill (CV-17)
- USN Independence (CV-22)

RN air cover for convoys en route to Salerno (6-6 August 1943)

RN Force V:

- HMS Battler (CVE-6/D18)
- HMS Stalker (CVE-15/D12)
- HMS Hunter (CVE-8/D80)

RN support for invasion of Salerno, Italy (8–16 August 1943) Operation Avalanche

RN Task Force 88 (Vain):

- HMS Unicorn (CV/I72)
- HMS Attacker (CVE-7/D02) Air Squadron 886
- HMS Battler (CVE-6/D18) Air Squadrons 807 and 808
- HMS Hunter (CVE-8/D80)
- HMS Stalker (CVE-15/D12)

USN raid on Marcus Island (31 Aug – 2 September 1943) USN Task Force 15:

- USS Essex (CV-9)
- USS Yorktown (CV-10)
- USS Independence (CVL-22)

USN invasion of Baker and Howland Islands (Sept 1943) USN Task Force ?

- USS Princeton (CVL-23)
- USS Belleau Wood (CVL-24)

USN raid on Tarawa and Makin Islands (18–19 September 1943) USN Task Force 50:

- USS Lexington (2) (CV-16)
- USS Princeton (CVL-23)
- USS Belleau Wood (CVL-24)

IJN ferry troops and equipment to reinforce Truk (Sept – October 1943)

- IJN Junyo (CVL)

RN Atlantic convoy escort (23 September 1943 – 25 March 1944)

RN:

- HMS Tracker (CVE/BAVG-6/D24)

RN Atlantic convoy escort of military convoy from Gibraltar to UK (30 Sept – 7 October 1943) Convoy MKF24

RN:

- HMS Attacker (CVE-7/D02) Air Squadrons 886 and 879

USN transport of aircraft and aircrews in Pacific (Oct 1943 – September 1945)

USN:

- USS Nassau (CVE-12)

USN Raid on Wake Island (5–6 October 1943) USN Task Force 14:

- USS Essex (CV-9)
- USS Lexington (2) (CV-16)
- USS Yorktown (2) (CV-10)
- USS Cowpens (CVL-25)
- USS Independence (CVL-22)
- USS Belleau Wood (CVL-24)

IJN Sortie To Eniwetok In Response to USN Raids on Wake (17–26 October 1943) No engagements

IJN Combined Fleet (Koga):

- IJN Shōkaku (CV)
- IJN Zuikaku (CV)
- IJN Zuihō (CVL)

IJN Ferry Aircraft to Reinforce Rabaul (30 Oct – 13 November 1943) Operation RO

IJN:

- IJN Shōkaku (CV)
- IJN Zuikaku (CV)

USN Atlantic anti-submarine patrols (mid Nov – 10 December 1943)

USN Task Group 21.11:

- USS Santee (CVE-29)

RN Indian Ocean Convoy Escort (Nov 1943 – January 1944) Convoys AB18, AB20, AB 24A, and AB27,

RN:

- HMS Battler (CVE-6/D18)

USN Raids on Rabaul (5 & 11 November 1943)

USN Task Force 38 (Sherman)

- USS Saratoga (CV-3)
- USS Princeton (CVL-23)

USN Task Group 50.3 (Montgomery)

- USS Essex (CV-9)
- USS Bunker Hill (CV-17)
- USS Independence (CVL-22)

Invasion of Makin Atoll (13–23 November 1943) Gilbert Islands US Task Forces ? and 52 (Turner):

- USS Enterprise (CV-6) First carrier-launched night flights
- USS Liscome Bay (CVE-56) Sunk by torpedo from I-175
- USS Coral Sea (CVE-57)
- USS Corregidor (CVE-58)

[DIFFERENT CARRIERS- NEED TO RECONCILE; DID ALL CARRIERS STRIKE MAKIN?] USN Task Group 50.1 – Carrier Interceptor Force – Mili Landing

- USS Yorktown (CV-10)
- USS Lexington (CV-16)
- USS Cowpens (CVL-25)

USN Task Group 50.2 – Northern Carrier Group – Makin Landing

- USS Enterprise (CV-6)
- USS Belleau Wood (CVL-24)
- USS Monterey (CVL-26) Until 8 Dec

USN Raids on Nauru Island (17–19 Nov & 8–12 December 1943) USN Task Group 50.4 – Relief Carrier Group – Nauru Landing

- USS Saratoga (CV-3)
- USS Princeton (CVL-23)

USN Task Group 50.4 – from 43/11/25 [DOUBLE COUNTED?]

- USS Bunker Hill (CV-17) After 8 Dec?
- USS Monterey (CVL-26) After 8 Dec?

USN Invasion of Tarawa Atoll (18–23 November 1943) Gilbert Islands; USN Operation GALVANIC USN Task Force 38 (Radford) [TF 38 or 50?] [DOUBLE COUNTING?]

- USS Saratoga (CV-3)
- USS Essex (CV-9)

USN Task Force 50 (Nov – December 1943) Invasion of Gilbert Islands; USN Operation "GALVANIC"

- USS Saratoga (CV-3) Air Squadrons VF-12, VB-12, VT-12 [50.4]
- USS Enterprise (CV-6) Air Squadrons VF-2, VB-6, VT-6
- USS Essex (CV-9) Air Squadrons VF-9, VB-9, VT-9; Until 8 Dec
- USS Yorktown (CV-10) Air Squadrons VF-5, VB-5, VT-5
- USS Lexington (CV-16) Air Squadrons VF-16, VB-16, VT-16
- USS Bunker Hill (CV-17) Air Squadrons VF-17, VB-17, VT-17
- USS Independence (CVL-22) Air Squadrons VF-6, VF-22, VC-22
- USS Princeton (CVL-23) Air Squadrons VF-23, VT-23
- USS Belleau Wood (CVL-24) Air Squadrons VF-6, VF-24, VC-22
- USS Cowpens (CVL-25) Air Squadrons VF-6, VF-25, VC-25
- USS Monterey (CVL-26) Air Squadrons VF-30, VC-30; Until 8 Dec

USN Task Group 50.2 – Northern Carrier Group – Makin Landing (Radford)

- USS Enterprise (CV-6)
- USS Belleau Wood (CVL-24)

USN Task Group 50.3 -Southern Carrier Group – Tarawa Landing

- USS Essex (CV-9)
- USS Bunker Hill (CV-17) Until 8 Dec
- USS Independence (CVL-22) Until 23 Nov

USN Task Force 52: USN Task Group 52.3 – Air Support Group: USN CVE CarDiv24:

- USS Liscome Bay (CVE-56) Air Squadron VC-39; Sunk by aircraft 24 Nov
- USS Coral Sea (CVE-57) Air Squadron VC-33
- USS Corregidor (CVE-58) Air Squadron VC-41

USN Task Group 52.13 CarDiv24- Northern Attack Force (created 23 Nov):

- USS Nassau (CVE-16) attached from TG 53.6
- USS Barnes (CVE-20)

[DUPLICATION HERE]

- USS Liscome Bay (CVE-56) Air Squadron VC-39; Sunk by aircraft 24 Nov
- USS Coral Sea (CVE-57) Air Squadron VC-33
- USS Corregidor (CVE-58) Air Squadron VC-41 From 28 Nov

USN Task Force 53: USN Task Group 53.6 – Carrier (Support) Group: USN Task Unit 53.6.1 CarDiv22:

- USS Sangamon (CVE-26) CVEG-37 Air Squadrons VF-37, VC-37
- USS Suwannee (CVE-27) CVEG-60 Air Squadrons VF-60, VC-60
- USS Chenango (CVE-28) CVEG-35 Air Squadrons VF-35, VC-35
- USS Barnes (CVE-20)
- USS Nassau (CVE-16) From 18 to 28 November 11/18; Future Tarawa garrison, not part of CarDiv22

USN Atlantic transport of aircraft to UK (22 Dec – 24 Jan)

USN:

- USS Santee (CVE-29)

USN Raid on Mili Atoll and Jaluit Atoll in the Marshall Islands (19–25 November 1943) USN Task Group 50.1 – Carrier Interceptor Force – Mili Landing

- USS Yorktown (CV-10)
- USS Lexington (CV-16)
- USS Cowpens (CVL-25)

USN Invasion of Abemama Atoll in the Gilbert Islands (21 November 1943) USN Task Group 50.4 – Relief Carrier Group – Nauru Landing

- USS Saratoga (CV-3)

IJN Convoys to Truk and Singapore (Nov 1943) IJN ?

- IJN Zuikaku (CV)
- IJN Chuyo (CVE)
- IJN Unyo (CVE)

IJN ?

- IJN Shōkaku (CV)
- IJN Chitose (CVE)

Raids on Kwajalein Atoll and Wotje Atoll in the Marshall Islands (4 & 8–9 December 1943)

- USS Enterprise (CV-6)
- USS Essex (CV-9)

USN Task Group 50.1 – Carrier Interceptor Force – Mili Landing

- USS Yorktown (CV-10)
- USS Lexington (CV-16) Disabled by aerial torpedo
- USS Cowpens (CVL-25)

USN Task Group 50.2 – Northern Carrier Group – Makin Landing

- USS Enterprise (CV-6)
- USS Belleau Wood (CVL-24)
- USS Monterey (CVL-26) Until 8 Dec

USN Task Group 50.3 -Southern Carrier Group – Tarawa Landing

- USS Essex (CV-9)
- USS Bunker Hill (CV-17) Until 8 Dec
- USS Independence (CVL-22) Until 23 Nov

=== 1944 ===
Information for this section was obtained from online ship histories, principally from the following sources:

1. Dictionary of American Naval Fighting Ships
2. Royal and Dominion Navy Warships
3. Imperial Japanese Navy Page
4. Naval War In The Pacific 1941–1945
5. World War II Database

USN aircraft and aircrew transport from US West Coast to Pacific areas (1944–1945)

USN:

- USS Long Island (CVE-1)

RN Anti-submarine patrols in Indian Ocean (Jan – March 1944) Operation COVERED; group sank German Supply ship Brake.

RN Force 67, CS4:

- HMS Battler (CVE-6/D18)

RN Convoy Escort in Southwest Approaches (Jan – June 1944) Convoys OS68, ONS29, SL150, MKS41, and SC156.

RN 7th and 9th Escort Groups:

- HMS Biter (CVE/BAVG-3/D97) Air Squadron 811

USN Raids on Kavieng, New Ireland (1–4 January 1944): USN Task Force 37: USN Task Group 37.2:

- USS Bunker Hill (CV-17)
- USS Monterey (CVL-26)

RN Convoy escort in North Atlantic (31 Jan – 4 July 1944) Convoys OS66/KMS70, ON222 and ONS28 (distant cover), SL147/MKS38, HX225, CU13, OS69/KMS43, MKF29, OS72/KMS46, SL154/MKS45, SL157/MKS48 and SL158/MKS49, KMF32, and KMF34

RN Western Approaches Command:

- HMS Activity (D94) Jan – March 1944
- HMS Nairana (D05)

USN Invasion of Kwajalein and Roi-Namur in the Marshall Islands (29 Jan-3 February 1944) Operation FLINTLOCK USN Task Force 58 (Spruance/Mitscher) USN Task Group 58.1 – Roi-Namur Landing USN Task Unit 58.1.5 – Carrier Unit:

- USS Enterprise (CV-6) CVG-10 Air Squadrons VF-10, VB-10, VT-10
- USS Yorktown (CV-10) CVG-5 Air Squadrons VF-5, VB-5, VT-5
- USS Belleau Wood (CVL-24) CVG-24 Air Squadrons VF-24, VT-24

USN Task Group 58.2 – Maloelap Landing:

- USS Essex (CV-9) CVG-9 Air Squadrons VF-9, VB-9, VT-9
- USS Intrepid (CV-11) CVG-6 Air Squadrons VF-6, VB-6, VT-6, VF(N)-78
- USS Cabot (CVL-28) CVG-31 Air Squadrons VF-31, VT-31

USN Task Group 58.3 – Eniwetok Landing [ENIWETOK? NOT KWAJALEIN??]:

- USS Bunker Hill (CV-17) CVG-17 Air Squadrons VF-18, VB-17, VT-17
- USS Monterey (CV-26) CVG-30 Air Squadrons VF-30, VT-30
- USS Cowpens (CV-25) CVG-25 Air Squadrons VF-25, VT-25

USN Task Group 58.4 – Wotje Landing:

- USS Saratoga (CV-3) CVG-12 Air Squadrons VF-12, VB-12, VT-12
- USS Princeton (CV-23) CVG-23 Air Squadrons VF-23, VT-23
- USS Langley (CV-27) CVG-32 Air Squadrons VF-32, VT-32
- USS[5 CVE PER WIKI??]

USN Task Force 51 (Jan – February 1944) 11 CVEs? USN Task Group 51.2 – Ma juro Attack Group

- USS Nassau (CVE-16) Air Squadron VC-66
- USS Natoma Bay(CVE-62) Air Squadron VC-63

USN Task Group 52.9 – Southern Carrier Group: USN Task Unit 52.9.1 – CarDiv24:

- USS Manila Bay (CVE-16 Air Squadron VC-7
- USS Coral Sea (CVE-57) Air Squadron VC-33
- USS Corregidor (CVE-58) Air Squadron VC-41

Task Force 53 – Northern Attack Force (Roi-Namur): Task Group 53.6 – Northern Carrier Group: CarDiv22:

- USS Sangamon (CVE-26) CVEG-37 Air Squadrons VF-37, VC-37
- USS Suwannee (CVE-27) CVEG-60 Air Squadrons VF-60, VC-60
- USS Chenango (CVE-28) CVEG-35 Air Squadrons VF-35, VC-35

Task Force 53 – Southern Attack Force, Operation SEVEDORE (Guam 21 July) Task Group 53.7 – Carrier Support Group CarDiv22:

- USS Sangamon (CVE-26) Air Squadrons VF-37, VT-37)
- USS Suwannee (CVE-27) Air Squadrons VF-60, VT-60)
- USS Chenango (CVE-28) Air Squadrons VF-35, VT-35)

Task Unit 53.7.1 From 21 June: CarDiv24:

- USS Coral Sea (CVE-57) Air Squadron VC-33
- USS Corregidor (CVE-58) Air Squadron VC-41
- USS Kalinin Bay (CVE-68) Air Squadron VC-3

USN Invasion of Enewetak Atoll in the Marshall Islands (Jan – February 1944) USN Operation CATCHPOLE USN Task Force 51: USN Task Group 51.17 – Fire Support Group 3 CVE

RN Convoy escort to/from West Africa and Gibraltar (29 Jan – 9 March 1944) Convoys SL147/KMS38, ON222, ONS28, OS69/KMS43, and MKF29; attacked by IGEL Group of U-Boats; escort group "operating independently" sank U-592, U-762, U-238 and U-734;

RN 2nd British Escort Group:

- HMS Activity (CVE/D94) Air Squadron 819
- HMS Nairana (CVE/D05)

USN Atlantic to Pacific transport of aircraft and personnel (Feb – March 1944)

USN:

- USS Santee (CVE-29)

USN Marshalls and Gilberts Escort and Patrol Force (Feb–Sept 1944)

USN Task Force 96 (Harrill): USN Task Group 96.? Hunter-Killer Group June–Aug 1945

- USS Kasaan Bay (CVE-

USN Raid on Truk (17–18 February 1944) Caroline Islands; Operation HAILSTONE Note: The raid destroyed 18 aircraft delivered by CVE IJN Kaiyo just 8 days before. US Task Force 58 (Spruance/Mitscher) [5 CV & 4 CVL per wiki- OK USN Task Force 58: USN Task Group 58.1:

- USS Enterprise (CV-6) CVG-10 Air Squadrons VF-10, VB-10, VT-10; First carrier-launched night radar bombing attack
- USS Yorktown (CV-5) CVG-5 Air Squadrons VF-5, VB-5, VT-5
- USS Belleau Wood (CVL-24) CVG-24 Air Squadrons VF-24, VT-24

USN Task Group 58.2:

- USS Essex (CV-9) CVG-9 Air Squadrons VF-9, VB-9, VT-9
- USS Intrepid (CV-11) CVG-6 Air Squadrons VF-6, VB-6, VT-6, VF(N)-78
- USS Cabot (CVL-28) CVG-31 Air Squadrons VF-31, VT-31

USN Task Group 58.3:

- USS Bunker Hill (CV-17) CVG-17 Air Squadrons VF-18, VB-17, VT-17
- USS Monterey (CVL-26 CVG-30 Air Squadrons VF-30, VT-30
- USS Cowpens (CVL-25) CVG-25 Air Squadrons VF-25, VT-25

USN Raid on Jaluit Atoll (20 February 1944) Marshall Islands

- USS Enterprise (CV-6)

USN Raid on Marianas Islands (25? February 1944)

- USS Essex (CV-9)

RN antisubmarine operations with 6th Canadian Escort group in NW Approaches. (9–28 March 1944) problems with estreme weather, contamination of aircraft fuel, and malfunctioning depth charges.

RN:

- HMS Vindex(D15) Air Squadron 825

USN Raid on Palau Islands (30–31 March 1944) Operation DESECRATE 1 USN Task Group 58:

- USS Enterprise (CV-6)
- USS Bunker Hill (CV-17)
- USS Hornet (CV-12)
- USS Yorktown (CV-10)
- USS Lexington (CV-16)
- USS Monterey (CV-26)
- USS Belleau Wood (CVL-24)
- USS Cowpens (CVL-25)
- USS Cabot (CVL-28)
- USS Princeton (CVL-23)
- USS Langley (CVL-27)

USN Resupply TF-58 at Majuro in the Marshall Islands and Tulagi in the Solomons (15 Mar – 7 April 1944) USN Task Force 50: USN Task Group 50.15- Fast Carrier Supply Group USN CarDiv22:

- USS Sangamon (CVE-26) Air Squadrons VF-37, VT-37)
- USS Suwannee (CVE-26) Air Squadrons VF-60, VT-60)
- USS Chenango (CVE-28) Air Squadrons VF-35, VT-35)
- USS Santee ((CVE-29) Air Squadrons VF-26, VT-26)

IJN Ferry Aircraft to Singapore (Mar 1944)

- IJN Shōkaku (CV)
- IJN Zuikaku (CV)

USN Raid on Mili Atoll in the Marshall Islands (18 March 1944) USN Task Force 50 USN Task Group 50.10:

- USS Lexington (CV-16)

IJN Ferry Aircraft to Saipan, Guam, and Palau (Mar 1944)

- IJN Ryuho (CVL)
- IJN Chiyoda (CVL)
- IJN Chitose (CVL)

USN Invasion of Emirau Island, New Guinea (20 March 1944) Operation CARTWHEEL

USN Task Force? (Giffin?)

- USS Enterprise (CV-6) Detached from TF 58
- USS Manila Bay (CVE-61)
- USS Natoma Bay (CVE-62)

USN Invasion at Hollandia (Mar–Apr 1944) Operation RECKLESS

USN Fifth Fleet (Spruance):

- USS Enterprise (CV-6)

USN Task Group 78.1 (Ragsdale) CarDiv22:

- USS Sangamon (CVE- CVEG-37: VF-37, VT-37
- USS Suwannee (CVE- CVEG-60: VF-60, VT-60
- USS Chenango (CVE- CVEG-35: VF-35, VT-35
- USS Santee (CVE-29) CVEG-26: VF-36, VT-36

USN Task Group 78.2 (Davison) CarDiv24:

- USS Natoma Bay (CVE- VC-63
- USS Coral Sea (CVE- VC-33
- USS Corregidor (CVE- VC-41
- USS Manila Bay (CVE- VC-7

USN Invasion of Emirau Island, New Guinea (20–27 March 1944)

USN Task Force 36: USN Task Group 36.1

- USS Enterprise (CV-6)

USN Task Group 36.3

- USS Manila Bay (CVE-61) Air Squadron VC-7
- USS Natoma Bay (CVE-62) Air Squadron VC-63;

From 2 Apr

- USS Corregidor (CVE-58)
- USS Coral Sea (CVE-57) Air Squadron VC-33

USN Raid on Palau Island (28–29 March 1944) USN Operation DESECRATE I

USN Task Force 58: USN Task Group 58.1

- USS Enterprise (CV-6)
- USS Cowpens (CVL-25) CVG-25

USN Task Group 58.2

- USS Bunker Hill (CV-17) CVG-8
- USS Hornet (CV-12) CVG-2
- USS Monterey (CVL-26) CVG-30

Cabot (CV-28) CVG-31 USN Task Group 58.3

- USS Yorktown (CV-10)

USN Task Group 50.10:

- USS Lexington (CV-16)
- USS Princeton (CVL-23) CVG-23
- USS Langley (CVL-27) CVG-32

USN Task Group 58.5

- USS Saratoga (CV-3)

USN Task Group 58.9

- USS Lexington (CV-16)
- USS Cowpens (CVL-25)

RN Russian convoy escort to/from Murmansk (29 Mar – 14 April 1944) Operation FY; Convoy JW58 and RA58;

RN 2nd Escort Group:

- HMS Tracker (CVE/BAVG-6/D24) sank U-288
- HMS Activity (CVE/D94) Air Squadron 819

USN Raid on Yap in Caroline Islands (31 March 1944)

USN Task Force 58:

- USS Enterprise (CV-6)

USN Raid on Ulithi in Caroline Islands (31 March 1944)

USN Task Force 58:

- USS Enterprise (CV-6)

USN Raid on Woleai in Caroline Islands (1 April 1944) USN Task Force 58:

- USS Enterprise (CV-6)

USN Hunter Killer Groups Patrol Seaway from Pearl Harbor to Midway (Mar – May 1944)

USN Task Group 11.1:

- USS Altamaha (CVE-18) Squadron VC-66 damaged I-45

USN Task Group 11.2:

- USS Kalinin Bay (CVE-68)
- USS Fanshaw Bay (CVE-70)

IJN Transportation and Convoy Escort to Formosa, Indochina, and Singapore (Apr – June 1944)

- IJN Kaiyo (CVE) convoy is attached by USN submarines

USA Invasion at Hollandia (13 Apr – 14 May 1944) US Operations RECKLESS and PERSECUTION

RN Raids on Sabang (19 April 1944) Sumatra, Indonesia, Operation COCKPIT

Eastern Fleet:

- USS Saratoga (CV-3)
- HMS Illustrious (87)

USA Invasion at Hollandia, Netherlands New Guinea (13 Apr – 14 May 1944) US Operations RECKLESS and PERSECUTION USN Task Force 58: USN Task Group 58.1:

- USS Hornet (CV-12)
- USS Belleau Wood (CV-24)
- USS Cowpens (CVL-25)
- USS Bataan (CVL-29)

USN Task Group 58.2:

- USS Bunker Hill (CV-17)
- USS Yorktown (CV-10)
- USS Monterey (CVL-26)
- USS Cabot (CV-28)

USN Task Group 58.3:

- USS Enterprise (CV-6)
- USS Lexington (CV-16)
- USS Princeton (CVL-23)
- USS Langley (CVL-27)

RN Russian convoy escort to/from Kola Inlet (19 Apr – 4 May 1944) Operation FZ; Convoys ?, RA59; brought Russian naval personnel from Murmansk to man ships being transferred to Russia.

RN:

- HMS Activity (CVE/D94)
- HMS Fencer (CVE-14/D64) aircraft sank U-277, U-674 and U-959.

RN anti-submarine operations in Northwest Approaches with 5th Escort Group (27 Apr – 12 May 1944) experienced extreme weather, petrol contamination, and crash landings.

RN:

- HMS Vindex (D15)

USN Raid on Truk in the Caroline Islands (29–30 April 1944)

USN Task Force 58: USN Task Group 58.3:

- USS Enterprise (CV-6)

USN Raid on Paulus Islands (29–30 April 1944)

USN Task Force 58: USN Task Group 58.2:

- USS Bunker Hill (CV-17)
- USS Yorktown (CV-10)
- USS Monterey (CVL-26)
- USS Cabot (CV-28)

USN Task Group 58.3:

- USS Enterprise (CV-6)
- USS Lexington (CV-16)
- USS Princeton (CVL-23)
- USS Langley (CVL-27)

USN

- Approach to the Philippines

58.1 strike Wakde & Sawar Invasion Battle of Wakde 18–21 May 1944 US Operation STRAIGHT LINE 58.2 strike Wakde, Hollandia Battle of Hollandia Operation RECKLESS 58.3 strike Hollandia, support Tanahmerah Bay Landing 44/04/29 strike Truk 44/04/30 strike Palaus

USN Raid on Pohnpei in the Caroline Islands (1 May 1944) USN Task Force 58: USN Task Group 58.1:

- USS Cowpens (CVL-25)

RN Convoy escort defense in Mediterranean Sea Convoys OS177/KMS51

RN:

- HMS Attacker (CVE-7/D02) Air Squadron 879

RN Anti-Submarine Patrols in the Indian Ocean (17 May – 27 November 1944)

RN Task Force 66:

- HMS Shah (CVE-43/D21) Air Squadron 851; head of hunter-killer group which sank U-198 in the Indian Ocean on 12 August 1944
- HMS Begum (CVE-36/D38)

USN Transport to Marshall and Mariana Islands (May – August 1944) USN Operation "FORAGER"

USN Task Force 51 USN Task Group 51.18: USN Task Unit 51.18.10:

- USS White Plains (CVE-66)

USN Task Unit 51.18.11

- USS Copahee (CVE-12)

USN Task Group 52.11- Carrier Support Group 2 USN Task Unit 52.11.1 CarDiv26:

- USS Kitkun Bay (CVE-71) Air Squadron VC-5
- USS Gambier Bay (CVE-73) Air Squadron VC-10

USN Task Unit 52.11.2 CarDiv24:

- USS Sangamon (CVE-26)
- USS Suwannee (CVE-27)
- USS Coral Sea (CVE-57) Air Squadron VC-33; From 20 June
- USS Corregidor (CVE-58) Air Squadron VC-41

USN Task Group 52.14 – Carrier Support Group 1: USN Task Unit 52.14.1 CarDiv25:

- USS Midway (CVE-63) Air Squadron VC-65
- USS Fanshaw Bay (CVE-70) Air Squadron VC-68; Until 18 June

USN Task Unit 52.14.2:

- USS White Plains (CVE-66) Air Squadron VC-4)
- USS Kalinin Bay (CVE-68) Air Squadron VC-3; From July
- USS Nehenta Bay (CVE-74)

USN Task Force 57: USN Task Group 57.4: USN Task Unit 57.4.11 [AND/OR 57.19.7; SEE BELOW]

- USS Monterey (CVL-26)

USN Task Group 57.5: USN Task Unit 57.5.5:

- USS Kalinin Bay (CVE-68)

USN Task Group 57.19: USN Task Unit 57.19.7:

- USS Monterey (CVL-26)

RN Anti-submarine sweeps of Indian Ocean (May–Oct 1944) U-198 sunk by HM Frigate FINDHORN was the only U-Boat sinking by the Eastern Fleet Hunting Groups.

RN Force 66:

- HMS Begum (CVE-36/D38/R305) 832 Naval Air Squadron

RN Raid on German Shipping Off Norway (6 May 1944) Operation CROQUET

RN:

- HMS Furious (CV D-47)
- HMS Searcher (CVE-22/D-40)

RN Raid in German Convoy and Shore Targets at Kristiansund, Norway (8 May 1944) Operation HOOPS

RN:

- HMS Searcher (CVE-22/D-40)
- HMS Striker (CVE-19)
- HMS Emperor (CVE-34)

Raid on Soerabaja in Java, Indonesia (17 May 1944) Operation TRANSOM Eastern Fleet:

- USS Saratoga (CV-3)
- HMS Illustrious (87)

USN Raid on Marcus Island (19–20 May 1944) USN Task Force 58: USN Task Group 58.6 (15–31 May 1944):

- USS Wasp (CV-18) CVG-14
  - USS Essex (CV-9) CVG-15
- USS San Jacinto (CVL-30)

USN Raid on Wake Island (23 May 1944)

- USS Essex (CV-9)

USN Hunter Killer Group Patrols (May – June 1944) USN Task Group 30.4:

- USS Hoggart Bay (CV-75) Group sank I-16, RO-106, RO-104, RO-116, RO-108, RO-105, and RO-111.

IJN Transportation of Aircraft and Convoy Escort to Philippines (May – August 1944)

- IJN Taiyo (CVE) sunk by USS Rasher (18 August 1944)
- IJN Kaiyo (CVE)
- IJN Shinyo (CVE)

USN Transportation to Marshall and Mariana Islands (May – August 1944) Part of USN Operation FORAGER USN Task Force 51: USN Task Group 51.18: USN Task Unit 51.18.10:

- USS White Plains (CVE-66)

TU 51.18.11

- USS Copahee (CVE-12)

RN Prevention of U-boat activity around Normandy during D-Day Landings (June 1944) Operation NEPTUNE part of Operation OVERLORD

RN at Southwest Approaches, 150 mi west of Lands End: RCN 1st, 3rd, 4th 6th and 9th (Canadian) Support Groups

- HMS Emperor (CVE-34/D-98)
- HMS Tracker (CVE, BAVG-6)
- HMS Pursuer (CVE-17/D-73)

[Vindex and Activity were NOT there as reported elsewhere. Only 3 CVEs were there per Mawdsley p. 424]

[?1. Eastern Task Force 2. Western Task Force?]

RN Indian Ocean convoy escort (June – July 1944) Convoys CM33 and KR11.

RN:

- HMS Battler (CVE-6/D18)

RN Atlantic Convoy Protection to/from Gibraltar (June – August 1944) Convoys OS79, MKS53, SL160 MKS51, OS82, KMS56, SL163, MKS54, SL163, MKS54, OS85, KMS59, SL166 and MKS57.

RN:

- HMS Campania (D48) Air Squadron 813

RN Atlantic convoy escort (2 June – August 1944) Convoys OS78/KMS52, SL159/MKS50, SL162/MKS53, KMF33, MKF33, OS86/KMS60, SL167,

RN:

- HMS Activity (CVE/D94)

RN Simulated attack on Sabang, Sumatra as diversion for USN attacks on the Mariana Islands (11–13 June 1944) Operation COUNCILLOR

RN:

- HMS Illustrious (CV/87)
- HMS Atheling (CVE-33/D-51)

USN Support for Invasion of Marianas (June – August 1944) Part of USN Operation FORAGER

USN Task Force 58:

USN Task Force 50: USN Task Group 50.?:

- USS Manila Bay (CVE-61)
- USS Natoma Bay (CVE-62)

USN Task Group 50.17 – Fueling & Aircraft Replacement Group; Refueled TF-58 and TF-53:

- USS Monterey (CVL-26)
- USS Copahee (CVE-12)
- USS Breton (CVE-23)

USN Raid on Saipan in the Mariana Islands (11–14 June 1944)

US Task Force 58/Fifth Fleet ((Mitscher/Spruance):

- USS Enterprise (CV-6)

USN Raid on Rota in the Mariana Islands (11–14 June 1944)

USN Task Force 58/Fifth Fleet ((Mitscher/Spruance):

- USS Enterprise (CV-6)

USN Raid on Guam in the Mariana Islands (11–14 June 1944) Part of USN Operation FORAGER

US Task Force 58/Fifth Fleet ((Mitscher/Spruance): USN Task Group 58.1 CarDiv5:

- USS Hornet (CV-12)CVG-2)
- USS Yorktown (CV-10) CVG-1; Until 31 July
- USS Belleau Wood (CVL-24) CVG-24; Until 2 Aug
- USS Bataan (CVL-29) CVG-50

USN Task Group 58.2:

- USS Bunker Hill (CV-17) CVG-8
- USS Wasp (CV-18) CVG-14; From 30 June
- USS Franklin (CV-13) 30 June – 29 July
- USS Monterey (CVL-26) CVG-28; Until 07/23),
- USS Cabot (CVL-28) CVG-31; Until 13 July
- USS Enterprise (CV-6) [?? WAS ENTERPRISE IN 58.3 PART OF GUAM RAID??]

USN Raids on IJN Convoys Trying to Reinforce Mariana Islands (11–13 June 1944) Part of USN Operation FORAGER US Task Force 58/Fifth Fleet ((Mitscher/Spruance): USN Task Group 58.4

- USS Essex (CV-9) CVG-15
- USS Langley (CVL-27) CVG-32
- USS Cowpens (CVL-25) CVG-25: Until 10 July

USN Raid on Chichijima (14 June 1944) Part of USN Operation FORAGER US Task Force 58/Fifth Fleet ((Mitscher/Spruance): USN Task Group 58.1 CarDiv5:

- USS Hornet (CV-12)CVG-2)
- USS Yorktown (CV-10) CVG-1; Until 31 July
- USS Belleau Wood (CVL-24) CVG-24; Until 2 Aug
- USS Bataan (CVL-29) CVG-50

USN Task Group 58.4

- USS Essex (CV-9) CVG-15
- USS Langley (CVL-27) CVG-32
- USS Cowpens (CVL-25) CVG-25: Until 10 July

USN Raid on Iwo Jima (15–16 June 1944) Part of USN Operation FORAGER US Task Force 58/Fifth Fleet ((Mitscher/Spruance): USN Task Group 58.1 CarDiv5:

- USS Hornet (CV-12)CVG-2)
- USS Yorktown (CV-10) CVG-1; Until 31 July
- USS Belleau Wood (CVL-24) CVG-24; Until 2 Aug
- USS Bataan (CVL-29) CVG-50

USN Task Group 58.4

- USS Essex (CV-9) CVG-15
- USS Langley (CVL-27) CVG-32
- USS Cowpens (CVL-25) CVG-25: Until 10 July

USN Invasion of Saipan in the Marina Islands (15 June – 9 July 1944) Part of USN Operation FORAGER USN Task Force 58/Fifth Fleet ((Mitscher/Spruance): USN Task Group 58.1 CarDiv5:

- USS Hornet (CV-12)CVG-2)
- USS Yorktown (CV-10) CVG-1; Until 31 July
- USS Belleau Wood (CVL-24) CVG-24; Until 2 Aug
- USS Bataan (CVL-29) CVG-50

USN Task Group 58.1 CarDiv5 From 30 June:

- USS Franklin (CV-13) From 29 July
- USS Hornet (CV-12) CVG-2
- USS Yorktown (CV-10) CVG-1 Until 29 July
- USS Bataan (CVL-29) CVG-50 Until 12 July
- USS Cabot (CVL-28) CVG-31 From 13 July

USN Task Group 58.2:

- USS Bunker Hill (CV-17) CVG-8
- USS Wasp (CV-18) CVG-14; From 30 June
- USS Franklin (CV-13) 30 June – 29 July
- USS Monterey (CVL-26) CVG-28; Until 23 July
- USS Cabot (CVL-28) CVG-31; Until 13 July

USN Task Group 58.3:

- USS Lexington (CV-16) CVG-16
- USS Enterprise (CV-6) CVG-10
- USS San Jacinto (CVL-30) CVG-51
- USS Princeton (CVL-23) CVG-27; Until ? July

USN Task Group 58.4

- USS Essex (CV-9) CVG-15
- USS Langley (CVL-27) CVG-32
- USS Cowpens (CVL-25) CVG-25: Until 10 July
- USS Princeton (CVL-23) CVG-27: 14 July – 2 Aug
- USS Belleau Wood (CVL-24) From 2 Aug

USN Task Group 52.11

- USS Kitkun Bay (CVE) VC-5
- USS Gambier Bay (CVE) VC-10
- Uss Corregidor (CVE) VC-41
- USS Coral Sea (CVE) VC-33

USN Task Group 52.14

- USS Fanshaw Bay (CVE) VC-68
- USS Midway (CVE) VC-65
- USS White Plains (CVE) VC-4
- USS Kalinin Bay (CVE) VC-3

USN Task Force 53.7

- USS Sangamon (CVE) VF-37, VT-37
- USS Suwannee (CVE) VF-60, VT-60
- USS Chenano (CVE) VF-35, VT-35

USN/IJN Battle of the Philippine Sea (19–20 June 1944) USN Task Force 58/Fifth Fleet ((Mitscher/Spruance): 24 aircraft carriers, 1,350 carrier-based aircraft with 29 aircraft lost: USN Task Group 58.1 CarDiv5:

- USS Hornet (CV-12) CVG-2
- USS Yorktown (CV-10) CVG-1; Until 31 July
- USS Belleau Wood (CVL-24) CVG-24; Until 2 Aug
- USS Bataan (CVL-29) CVG-50

USN Task Group 58.2:

- USS Bunker Hill (CV-17) CVG-8
- USS Wasp (CV-18) CVG-14; From 30 June
- USS Franklin (CV-13) 30 June – 29 July
- USS Monterey (CVL-26) CVG-28; Until 07/23),
- USS Cabot (CVL-28) CVG-31; Until 13 July

USN Task Group 58.3:

- USS Lexington (CV-16) CVG-16
  - USS Enterprise (CV-6) CVG-10
- USS San Jacinto (CVL-30) CVG-51
- USS Princeton (CVL-23) CVG-27; Until ? July

USN Task Group 58.4

  - USS Essex (CV-9) CVG-15
- USS Langley (CVL-27) CVG-32
- USS Cowpens (CVL-25) CVG-25: Until 10 July
- USS Princeton (CVL-23) CVG-27: 14 July – 2 Aug
  - USS Belleau Wood (CVL-24) From 2 Aug

[* 15 US carriers PER WIKI, NOT RECONCILED] [* 7 US battleships?] IJN Third Fleet (Ozawa) Operation A-GO 429 aircraft lost IJN "Mobile Fleet", Carrier Division 1:

- IJN Shōkaku (CV) sunk by torpedoes from USS Cavalla
- IJN Zuikaku
- IJN Taihō (CV) sunk by torpedo from USS Albacore followed by large internal explosion due to aviation gas vapor

IJN "Van Force"

- IJN Zuihō (CVL)
- IJN Chiyoda (CVL) damaged by a bomb
- IJN Chitose (CVL)

IJN "Force B"

- IJN Junyo (CVL) damaged by bombs
- IJN Hiyō (CVL) sunk
- IJN Ryuho (CVL)

RN Diversional Raid on Norwegian Coast (20 June 1944) Operation WANDERERS

RN:

- HMS Striker (CVE-19/D-12)
- HMS Fencer (CVE-14/D-64)

Raid on Pagan Island in the Northern Mariana Islands (22–23 June 1944) Part of USN Operation FORAGER USN Task Force 58/Fifth Fleet ((Mitscher/Spruance): USN Task Group 58.1 CarDiv5:

- USS Hornet (CV-12) CVG-2
- USS Yorktown (CV-10) CVG-1; Until 31 July
- USS Belleau Wood (CVL-24) CVG-24; Until 2 Aug
- USS Bataan (CVL-29) CVG-50

USN Raid on Iwo Jima and Cicijima Island (24 June 1944) Part of USN Operation FORAGER USN Task Force 58/Fifth Fleet ((Mitscher/Spruance): USN Task Group 58.1 CarDiv5:

- USS Hornet (CV-12) CVG-2
- USS Yorktown (CV-10) CVG-1; Until 31 July
- USS Belleau Wood (CVL-24) CVG-24; Until 2 Aug
- USS Bataan (CVL-29) CVG-50

USN Raid on Pagan Island, Guam and Rota Island (28 June – 6 July 1944) Part of USN Operation FORAGER USN Task Force 58/Fifth Fleet ((Mitscher/Spruance): USN Task Group 58.4

  - USS Essex (CV-9) CVG-15
- USS Langley (CVL-27) CVG-32
- USS Cowpens (CVL-25) CVG-25: Until 10 July

RN anti-submarine operations in Northwest Approaches with 5th Escort Group (1–15 July 1944) experienced petrol contamination

RN:

- HMS Vindex (D15)
- HMS Striker (CVE-19/D12) from 10 July

USN Raid on Iwo Jima, Cicijima Island and Hahajima Island (3 July 1944) Part of USN Operation FORAGER USN Task Force 58/Fifth Fleet ((Mitscher/Spruance): USN Task Group 58.1 CarDiv5:

- USS Hornet (CV-12) CVG-2
- USS Yorktown (CV-10) CVG-1; Until 31 July
- USS Belleau Wood (CVL-24) CVG-24; Until 2 Aug
- USS Bataan (CVL-29) CVG-50

USN Task Group 58.2:

- USS Bunker Hill (CV-17) CVG-8
- USS Wasp (CV-18) CVG-14; From 30 June
- USS Franklin (CV-13) 30 June – 29 July
- USS Monterey (CVL-26) CVG-28; Until 23 July
- USS Cabot (CVL-28) CVG-31; Until 13 July

USN Raid on Rota Island (4 July 1944) Part of USN Operation FORAGER USN Task Force 58/Fifth Fleet ((Mitscher/Spruance): USN Task Group 58.4

  - USS Essex (CV-9) CVG-15
- USS Langley (CVL-27) CVG-32
- USS Cowpens (CVL-25) CVG-25: Until 10 July

USN Raid on Guam and Rota Island (6 July 1944) Part of USN Operation FORAGER USN Task Force 58/Fifth Fleet ((Mitscher/Spruance): USN Task Group 58.1 CarDiv5:

- USS Hornet (CV-12) CVG-2
- USS Yorktown (CV-10) CVG-1; Until 31 July
- USS Belleau Wood (CVL-24) CVG-24; Until 2 Aug
- USS Bataan (CVL-29) CVG-50

USN Task Group 58.2:

- USS Bunker Hill (CV-17) CVG-8
- USS Wasp (CV-18) CVG-14; From 30 June
- USS Franklin (CV-13) 30 June – 29 July
- USS Monterey (CVL-26) CVG-28; Until 23 July
- USS Cabot (CVL-28) CVG-31; Until 13 July

USN Raids on Guam (7–17 July 1944) Part of USN Operation FORAGER USN Task Force 58/Fifth Fleet ((Mitscher/Spruance): USN Task Group 58.1 CarDiv5:

- USS Hornet (CV-12) CVG-2
- USS Yorktown (CV-10) CVG-1; Until 31 July
- USS Belleau Wood (CVL-24) CVG-24; Until 2 Aug
- USS Bataan (CVL-29) CVG-50

USN Invasion of Guam (21 July – 10 August 1944) Part of USN Operation FORAGER USN Task Force 58/Fifth Fleet ((Mitscher/Spruance): USN Task Group 58.1 CarDiv5 From 30 June:

- USS Franklin (CV-13) From 29 July
- USS Hornet (CV-12) CVG-2
- USS Yorktown (CV-10) CVG-1 Until 29 July
- USS Bataan (CVL-29) CVG-50 Until 12 July
- USS Cabot (CVL-28) CVG-31 From 13 July

USN Task Group 58.4

- USS Essex (CV-9) CVG-15
- USS Langley (CVL-27) CVG-32
- USS Cowpens (CVL-25) CVG-25: Until 10 July
- USS Princeton (CVL-23) CVG-27: 14 July – 2 Aug
- USS Belleau Wood (CVL-24) From 2 Aug

USN Raids on Palau, Tinian Yap, Ulithi, and Fais Island (25–29 July 1944) Part of USN Operation FORAGER USN Task Force 58/Fifth Fleet ((Mitscher/Spruance): USN Task Group 58.1 CarDiv5 From 30 June:

- USS Franklin (CV-13) From 29 July
- USS Hornet (CV-12) CVG-2
- USS Yorktown (CV-10) CVG-1 Until 29 July
- USS Cabot (CVL-28) CVG-31 From 13 July

USN Task Group 58.2:

- USS Bunker Hill (CV-17) CVG-8
- USS Wasp (CV-18) CVG-14; From 30 June
- USS Franklin (CV-13) 30 June – 29 July

USN Task Group 58.3:

- USS Lexington (CV-16) CVG-16
- USS Enterprise (CV-6) CVG-10
- USS San Jacinto (CVL-30) CVG-51
- USS Princeton (CVL-23) CVG-27; Until ? July

USN Task Group 58.4

- USS Essex (CV-9) CVG-15
- USS Langley (CVL-27) CVG-32
- USS Princeton (CVL-23) CVG-27: 14 July – 2 Aug
- USS Belleau Wood (CVL-24) From 2 Aug

USN Raids on Guam (29 July – 5 August 1944) Part of USN Operation FORAGER USN Task Force 58/Fifth Fleet ((Mitscher/Spruance): USN Task Group 58.4

- USS Essex (CV-9) CVG-15
- USS Langley (CVL-27) CVG-32
- USS Princeton (CVL-23) CVG-27: 14 July – 2 Aug
- USS Belleau Wood (CVL-24) From 2 Aug

USN Raid on Cicijima Island (4–5 August 1944) Part of USN Operation FORAGER USN Task Force 58/Fifth Fleet ((Mitscher/Spruance): USN Task Group 58.1 CarDiv5 From 30 June:

- USS Franklin (CV-13) From 29 July
- USS Hornet (CV-12) CVG-2
- USS Yorktown (CV-10) CVG-1 Until 29 July
- USS Cabot (CVL-28) CVG-31 From 13 July

USN Task Group 58.2:

- USS Bunker Hill (CV-17) CVG-8
- USS Wasp (CV-18) CVG-14; From 30 June
- USS Franklin (CV-13) 30 June – 29 July

IJN Transportation of Aircraft to Philippines (July 1944) Note: Convoy (HI-69) attacked by USN submarines.

- IJN Taiyo (CVE) loaded with aircraft for delivery
- IJN Kaiyo (CVE) loaded with aircraft for delivery
- IJN Shinyo (CVE) provided Combat Air Patrols

USN Hunter/Killer CVE Patrolling Area Around Guam (July – August 1944) Hunter/Killer Group "Forager" Task Force 12.4:

- USS Hoggatt Bay (CVE-75) destroyer escort sinks sub RO-48

RN air attacks on airfield at Gossen, Norway and on shipping (9–10 August 1944) Operation OFFSPRING

RN:

- HMS Indefatigable (CV/R10) OR HMS Implacable (CV/86) [WHICH??? INCONSISTENT AT NAVAL HISTORY WEBSITE]
- HMS Trumpeter (CVE-37/D09)
- HMS Nabob (CVE-41/D77)

Anti-submarine patrols in Indian Ocean (Aug – November 1944)

RN:

- HMS Battler (CVE-6/D18)

RN/USN Invasion of Southern France (15 Aug – 15 September 1944) Operation ANVIL/DRAGOON

USN Task Force 88 (Troubridge): USN Task Group 88.1 provided fighter protection, spotting aircraft and close support during landings:

- HMS Seacher (CVE-22/D-40)
- HMS Attacker (CVE-7/D-02) Air Squadron 879
- HMS Emperor (CVE-34/D-98) attacked shore targets
- HMS Khedive (CVE-39/D62) CAP over landing area and attacked shore targets
- HMS Pursuer (CVE-17/D-73)

USN Task Group 88.?

- USS Tulagi (CVE-72)
- USS Kasaan Bay (CVE-69)
- HMS Hunter (CVE-8/D80) Air Squadron 807
- HMS Stalker (CVE-15/D91)

RN Escort for Russian convoy JW69 RA59 to Kola Inlet (17 Aug – 5 September 1944) Group sank U-344; problem with depth charges failing to explode.

RN Force 31:

- HMS Vindex (CVE/D15) Air Squadron 825
- HMS Striker (CVE-319/D912)

RN raids against Kaafjord, Norway to hit battleship Tirpitz (20–22 August 1944) Operation GOODWOOD

RN:

- HMS Indefatigable (CV/R10)
- HMS Formidable (CV/67)
- HMS Furious (CV/47)
- HMS Trumpeter (CVE-37/D09) diversionary raids on airfields at Hammerfest
- HMS Nabob (CVE-41/D77) torpedoed by U-354; never repaired

IJN Transportation of Aircraft to Singapore (Aug – November 1944) Convoys include HI-69, HI-70, HI-75, HI-76, and HI-18

- IJN Unyo (CVE) sunk by torpedoes from USS Barb (17 September 1944)
- IJN Shinyo (CVE) sunk by torpedoes from USS Spadefish (17 November 1944)

USN Raid on Iwo Jima in the Volcano Islands and Chichijima in the Bonin Islands (31 Aug-2 September 1944) USN Task Force 38/3rd Fleet? (Halsey/McCain?): USN Task Group 38.4:

- USS Enterprise (CV-6)
- USS Franklin (CV-13)
- USS San Jacinto (CVL-30)
- USS Belleau Wood (CVL-24)

all of these?

RN Aircraft transport to Far East (Sept 1944 – August 1945) Convoys MKS36 and KM39;

RN:

- HMS Activity (CVE/D94)

USN Raid on Wake Island (3 September 1944) USN Task Force 38/3rd Fleet? (Halsey/McCain?): USN Task Force 12 USN Task Group 12.5:

- USS Monteray (CVL-26)

USN Raid on Yap (6–8 September 1944) USN Task Force 38/3rd Fleet? (Halsey/McCain?):

- USS Enterprise (CV-6)

USN Raid on Ulithi (6–8 September 1944) USN Task Force 38/3rd Fleet? (Halsey/McCain?):

- USS Enterprise (CV-6)

USN Raid on Palau Islands (6–8 September 1944) USN Task Force 38/3rd Fleet? (Halsey/McCain?): USN Task Groups 38.2 and 38.4?

- USS Enterprise (CV-6)
- USS Essex (CV-9)

more? see fleet orgs

USN Raid on Mindanao Island (9 September 1944) USN Task Force 38/3rd Fleet? (Halsey/McCain?): USN Task Group 38.3:

- USS Essex (CV-9)

more?

RN Raids on Axis shipping and Crete, Scarpanto, and Rhodes in the Aegean Sea (9 September 1944) Operation OUTING I

RN:

- HMS Searcher (CVE-22/D-40)
- HMS Hunter (CVE-8/D80)
- HMS Khedive (CVE-39/D62) CAP, strikes on evacuating enemy shipping
- HMS Pursuer (CVE-17/D73)

RN Convoy escort from Gibraltar (10–14 September 1944) Convoy KMF34

RN Western Approaches Command:

- HMS Nairana (D05)

USN Raids on Japanese Shipping (10–20 September 1944) USN Task Force 38/3rd Fleet? (Halsey/McCain?):

- USS Enterprise (CV-6)
- USS Essex (CV-9)

RN minelaying and shipping attacks south of Volko Islands (11–12 September 1944) Operation BEGONIA

RN:

- HMS Furious (CV/47)
- HMS Trumpeter (CVE-37/D09)

USN Raids on Central Philippines- strike Visajans, Cebu, Negros (12 September 1944)

[TO BE COMPLETED] USN Task Groups 38.1, 38.2, 38.3; carriers?

- Hornet II?

44/09/21-24 38.1, 38.2, 38.3 strike Luzon – Nichols Field, Clark Field, Manila Bay 38.1, 38.4 strike N Luzon

USN strikes on 44/09/15 38.1 strike Morotai 38.4 strike Peleliu

RN Russian Convoy Escort to/from Kola Inlet (17 Sept – 3 October 1944) Operation RIGMAROLE; Convoys JW60 & RA60

RN:

- HMS Striker (CVE-19/D12)
- HMS Campania (D48) Air Squadron 842 or 813; sank U-921

USN Transport (?) and Anti-Submarine Patrols (?) Between Ulithi and Eniwetok (Sept 1944 – April 1945) [need to check each carrier's history here] USN Task Force 12 (Sept 1944 – April 1945) USN Task Group 12.2 (Jan – February 1945):

- USS Saratoga (CV-3)
- USS Randolph (CV-15)
- USS Bunker Hill (CV-17)
- USS Bennington (CV-20)
- USS Belleau Wood (CVL-24)

USN Task Group 12.3 (Mar – April 1945):

- USS Corregidor (CVE-58)

USN Task Group 12.4:

- USS Tulagi (CVE-72)

USN Task Group 12.5:

- USS Santee (CVE- 29)

RN Clearing Out the Aegean Area of the Mediterranean sea (Sept – November 1944) Operations OUTING I & II, MANNA, and CONTEMPT

RN British Aegean Fleet Force A:

- HMS Emperor (CVE-34/D98/307)
- HMS Hunter (CVE-8/D80)
- HMS Stalker (CVE-15/D12)
- HMS Attacker (CVE-7/D02)
- HMS Searcher (CVE-22/D-40)
- HMS Pursuer (CVE-17/D73)
- HMS Khedive (CVE-39/D62)

USN Invasion of Peleliu and Angaur Islands (Sept 1944 – November 1944) USN Task Group 38.4 – Peleliu landing – direct support 16–17 Sept

USN Task Group 32.4:

- USS Kadashan Bay (CVE-76) Utill 24 Aug
- USS Marcus Island (CVE-77) 12 Aug – 24 Aug
- USS Petrof Bay (CVE-80) 12 Aug – 24 Aug

USN Task Group 32.7 – Western Escort Carrier Group: Task Unit 32.7.1 CarDiv27:

- USS Kadashan Bay (CVE-76) Air Squadron VC-20
- USS Marcus Island (CVE-77) Air Squadron VC-21
- USS Savo Island (CVE-78) Air Squadron VC-27
- USS Ommaney Bay (CVE-79) Air Squadron VC-75

USN Task Unit 32.7.2 CarDiv28:

- USS Kalinin Bay (CVE-68) Air Squadron VC-3
- USS Petrof Bay (CVE-80) Air Squadron VC-76
- USS Saginaw Bay (CVE-82) Air Squadron VC-78

USN Task Unit 32.7.3 CarDiv26:

- USS White Plains (CVE-66) Air Squadron VC-4)
- USS Kitkun Bay (CVE-71) Air Squadron VC-5)
- USS Gambier Bay (CVE-73) Air Squadron VC-10)

USN Raid on Okinawa (10 or 12 October 1944) USN Task Force 38/3rd Fleet? (/Halsey)

- USS Enterprise (CV-6)
- USS Essex (CV-9)

USN Task Group 38.1, 38.3

RN Aerial minelaying and shipping strikes on Norwegian Coast (13–16 October 1944) Operation LYCIDAS

RN Force 9:

- HMS Fencer (CVE-14/D64)
- HMS Trumpeter (CVE-37/D09)

RN Escort for Russian Convoy JW61 (22–28 October 1944) Operation TRIAL No merchant ship losses.

RN:

- HMS Nairana (CVE/D05)
- HMS Tracker (CVE/BAVG-6/D24)
- HMS Vindex (CVE/D15)

RN Escort for Russian convoy JW RA61 and RA61 to/from Kola Inlet (23 Oct – 7 November 1944)

RN:

- HMS Vindex (CVE/D15) Air Squadron 811
- HMS Niarana (CVE/D05)
- HMS Tracker (CVE/BAVG-6/D24)

RN Aerial minelaying and airfield strikes on Norwegian Coast (23–24 October 1944) Operation HARDY

RN Force 2:

- HMS Trumpeter (CVE-37/D09)
- HMS Campania (CVE/D48)

USN Raids on Buka Island, Bonis, and Rabaul (1–5 November 1943) USN Task Force 38:

- USS Saratoga (CV-3)
- USS Princeton (CVL-23)

USN Raid on Formosa (12? October 1944) US Task Force 38/3rd Fleet? (/Halsey)

- USS Enterprise (CV-6)
- USS Essex (CV-9)

38.1 strike S Formosa 38.2 38.3

USN Raid on Philippines (10 to? 20 October 1944) US Task Force 38/3rd Fleet? (/Halsey)

- USS Enterprise (CV-6)

38.4 strike Aparri 38.2 + 38.3 Franklin damaged? 38.4 strike Legaspi and Clark Field, Luzon 38.1 + 38.4 strike Manila area:

[Layte not yet organized] [USN Task Group 30.3:] [CTF VAdm Mitscher, from 10/30 VAdm McCain] 19 Oct 8.1 + 38.4 proceed south to provide direct support for the landings at Leyte 38.1 – Cowpens+Cabot rejoined after covering retreat of "CripDiv1" – TU 30.3.1 21 Oct 38.2 strike Panay, Cebu, Negros, and Masbate 38.3 strike Visajans airfields – 200 miles NE of San Bernardino Straits 23 Oct Bunker Hill detached for overhaul 38.2 44/10/24 8 CV, 8 CVL, 6 BB, 15 CA(L), 58 DD 24 Oct x Sibuyan Sea 38.2, 38.3, 38.4 attacking Central Force 24 Oct 38.3 attacked by aircraft: Princeton disabled by dive bomber 38.4 off Leyte Gulf

USN/IJN Battle of Leyte Gulf and Invasion of the Philippines (20–26 October 1944) USN Operation King II; IJN Operation SHO-GO Note: First use of kamikazes and last battle between battleships. US Task Force 38/3rd Fleet (Halsey/McCain)

- USS Enterprise (CV-6)
- USS Essex (CV-9)
- USS Intrepid (CV-11)
- USS Franklin (CV-13)
- USS Lexington (CV-16)
- USS Independence (CVL-22)
- USS Belleau Wood (CVL-24)
- USS Langley (CVL-27)
- USS Cabot (CVL-28)
- USS San Jacinto (CVL-30)
- [8 CV, 8 CVL, 18 CVE per wiki]

IJN Mobile Fleet, Third Fleet CarDiv 3- "decoy fleet" (Ozawa) (Battle off Cape Engaño 25–26 October 1944)

- IJN Zuihō (CVL) sunk by bombs and aerial torpedoes
- IJN Zuikaku (CV) sunk by bombs and aerial torpedoes
- IJN Chiyoda (CVL) sunk by bombs and cruiser gunfire
- IJN Chitose (CVL) sunk by bombs or aerial torpedoes
- IJN Hyuga (BBV) damaged by near-missed bombs
- IJN Ise (BBV)

IJN Transport of Aviation Materials to Formosa (25 October 1944)

- IJN Ryuho (CVL)
- IJN Kaiyo (CVE)

USN Task Force 30- Leyte Landing (Oct – November 1944) [25 Oct TG 30.3 "DuBose Grip" created; TU 30.3.1 – "Crippled Division 1" ]

- USS Cowpens (CVL-25)
- USS Cabot (CVL-28)

USN Task Group 30.7- Hunter Killer Group:

- USS Anzio (CVE-57) Squadron VC-82

USN Task Group 30.8- At Sea Logistics Group:

- USS Nassau (CVE-16)
- USS Altamaha (CVE-18)
- USS Barnes (CVE-20)
- USS Nehenta Bay (CVE-74)
- USS Rudyerd Bay (CVE-81)
- USS Sargent Bay (CVE-83)
- USS Shipley Bay (CVE-85)
- USS Sitkoh Bay CVE-86)
- USS Steamer Bay (CVE-87)
- USS Cape Esperance (CVE-88)
- USS Kwajalein (CVE-98)

IJN Transport of Battleship Ammunition to Borneo and Suicide Subs and troops to the Philippines (30 Oct – 9 November 1944)

- IJN Junyo (CVL) transported supplies
- IJN Shinyo (CVE) provided air cover for part of return trip

USN Raids on Philippines (Nov – December 1944) US Task Force 38/3rd Fleet (Halsey/McCain) 44/11/05 off Polilo – strike Luzon, Mindoro, Manila Bay, Lingayen Gulf 38.1 – Wasp II new FF – strike Santa Cruz 38.2 – strike Luzon, Wedderburn detached to Ulithi for repairs 38.3 100 miles E of Luzon (16-17N, 123-38E) – attacked by kami. – damaged Lexington (16-20N, 123-59E) 38.1+38.3 strike Manila Bay: 6 NOV strike Luzon, Mindoro, Manila Bay, Lingayen Gulf, 44/11/11 38.1, 38.3, 38.4 strike reinforcement convoy (Operation "TA-3") heading to Ormoc Bay: 44/11/13 38.1, 38.3, 38.4 strike central and southern Luzon – primary target = ships that would reinforce Leyte: 44/11/14 38.1, 38.4 strike Luzon 44/11/25 strike Luzon: 38.2+38.3 strike "TA-5" convoys: 38.2 – Intrepid damaged by kamikaze (15-47N, 123-14E), Independence by aircraft landing accident (15-47N, 124-14E) Intrepid sinking APA T-6, T-10, damaging T-9 and Take at Balanacan Harbor, Marinduque Island (13-25N, 121-55E) 38.3 -kami – damage Essex (15-47N, 123-14E) Ticondegaga sinking Kumano in Dasol Bay, Luzon (15-45N, 119-48E) Essex and Langley sinking Jasoshima (15-45N, 119-45E) and landing ships T-112, T-142, T-161 (15-40N,191-45E) SW of Santa Cruz, Luzon Essex and Langley sinking AK Mane; 13–16 Dec strikes on Luzan; 38.2 – Hornet II. sinking landing ship;

- USS Enterprise (CV-6)
- USS Essex (CV-9) hit by kamikaze but remained on front lines

RN Russian Convoy to/from Murmansk (2–17 November 1944) Operation GOLDEN; Return convoys RA61A;

RN:

- HMS Campania (D48)

USN At Leyte Gulf (10–23 November 1944) Operation KING II Task Force 77: Task Group 77.4:

- USS Bismarck Sea 14–23 Nov
- USS Makin Island 10-? Nov

RN Strikes on German shipping off ListerfJord, Norway (12 November 1944) Operation COUNTERBLAST

RN:

- HMS Pursuer (CVE-17/D-73)

RN Strikes on German shipping at Trondheim and Titran, Norway (14 November 1944) Operation STEAK

RN:

- HMS Pursuer (CVE-17/D-73)

RN Aerial minelaying at Kara Sound and Salhusstrommen, Norway (20 November 1944) Operation HARDFAST

RN Force 3:

- HMS Pursuer (CVE-17/D73)
- HMS Premier (CVE-42/D23)

RN Raids on German shipping between Mosjoen and Rorvik, Norway (26 November 1944) Operation PROVIDENT

RN:

- HMS Implacable (CV/86)
- HMS Pursuer (CVE- ) returned early due to weather conditions
- HMS Premier (CVE-42/D23) returned early due to weather conditions

USN Task Force 30?- Strikes on Luzon and Mindoro Landing (25 Nov – December 1944) USN Operation "Love III" USN Task Force 38 (Dec 1944) [Mindoro Landings- Opn Love III] (Halsey/McCain) USN Task Group 38.1:

- USS Essex (CV-9)
- USS Wasp (CV-18)
- USS Yorktown (CV-10)
- USS Ticonderoga (CV-14)
- USS Langley (CVL-27)
- USS San Jacinto (CVL-30)

USN Task Group 38.2:

- USS Lexington (CV-16)
- USS Hornet (CV-12)
- USS Hancock (CV-19)
- USS Independence (CVL-22)
- USS Monterey (CVL-26)

USN Task Group 38.3:

- USS Essex (CV-9) [ALSO IN TG 38.1??]
- USS Ticonderoga (CV-14) [ALSO IN TG 38.1??]
- USS Langley (CVL-27) [ALSO IN TG 38.1??]

USN Task Group 30.7- Antisubmarine Warfare Group:

- USS Anzio (CVE-57) Squadron VC-82

USN Task Group 30.8- At Sea Logistical Group:

- USS Altamaha (CVE-18) Damaged in Typhoon "Cobra" (18 December 1944)
- USS Nehenta Bay (CVE-74) Damaged in Typhoon "Cobra" (18 December 1944)
- USS Rudyerd Bay (CVE-81)
- USS Shipley Bay (CVE-85) replacement planes
- USS Cape Esperance (CVE-88) Damaged in Typhoon "Cobra" (18 December 1944)
- USS Kwajalein (CVE-98)

USN Raid on Yap (Nov 1944)

- USS Enterprise (CV-6)

IJN Transport of Suicide Aircraft and Subs to Inland Sea (28–29 November 1944)

- IJN Shinano (CV) sunk by torpedoes from USS Archerfish

IJN Transport and Convoy Escort to and from Singapore (25 November 1944 – 13 January 1945) Note: Convoys include HI-83 and HI-84. IJN:

- IJN Kayio (CVE) convoys attached by USN submarines

RN Escort for Russian Convoys to/from Kola Inlet (1–19 December 1944) Operation ACUMEN; JW62 and RA62; group sank U-387 and U-365

RN:

- HMS Nairana (CVE/D05)
- HMS Campania (CVE/D48) aircraft sank U-365

RN Aerial minelaying and shipping strikes on Norwegian Coast (6–10 December 1944) Operation URBANE

RN Force 1:

- HMS Implacable (CV/86)
- HMS Trumpeter (CVE-37/D09)
- HMS Premier (CVE-42/D23)

RN Aerial minelaying and shipping strikes on Norwegian Coast (14–17 December 1944) Operation LACERATE

RN Force 2:

- HMS Trumpeter (CVE-37/D09)
- HMS Premier (CVE-42/D23)

USN Invasion of Luzon at Lingayen Gulf (Dec 1944)

- USS Essex (CV-9)

IJN Transport of Suicide Aircraft to Philippines (Dec 1944)

- IJN Unryu (CV) sunk by torpedoes from USS Redfish

IJN Transport of Suicide Aircraft to Formosa

- IJN Ryuho (CVL)

USN Experience with Typhon "Cobra" (18 December 1944) [typhoon "Cobra" – sunk Spence, damaged Cowpens, Monterey, Cabot, San Jacinto, Miami, Buchanan, Dyson, Hickox, Benham II]

USN Task Force 30- Luzon Landing (Dec 1944 – January 1945) USN Task Group 30.7- Hunter Killer Group:

- USS Anzio (CVE-57)

USN Task Group 30.8- 3rd Fleet Logistical Group:

- USS Altamaha (CVE-18)
- USS Nehenta Bay (CVE-74)
- USS Shipley Bay
- USS Kwajalein (CVE-98)

USN Raids on Formosa (Dec 1944 – February 1945) USN ?

- USS Essex (CV-9)

IJN ?

- IJN Ryuho (CVL) came under TFB attack by USN

USN Raids on Sakishima Island Group (Dec 1944 – February 1945)

- USS Essex (CV-9)

USN Raids on Okinawa (Dec 1944 – February 1945)

- USS Essex (CV-9)

=== 1945 ===
Information for this section was obtained from online ship histories, principally from the following sources:

1. Dictionary of American Naval Fighting Ships
2. Royal and Dominion Navy Warships
3. Imperial Japanese Navy Page
4. Naval War In The Pacific 1941–1945
5. World War II Database

RN Escort for Russian convoy JW63 and RA63 to/from Kola Inlet (1–21 January 1944)

RN:

- HMS Vindex (CVE/D15) Air Squadron 825

USN Raids- "MIKE I?." – Luzon Landing at Lingayen Gulf & Operation GRATITUDE (Indochina strikes?)] 1–25 January 1945 MORE ON THIS RE TF-38

USN Task Force 77: USN Task Group 77.14 Created 17 Jan: [8 CVE?]

- USS Wake island (CVE-
- USS Hoggatt Bay (CVE- damaged in accidental explosion
- USS Manila Bay (CVE-
- USS Shamrock Bay (CVE-
- USS Lunga Point (CVE-
- USS Ommaney Bay (CVE-79) Hit by kamikaze and scuttled 4 January 1945

USN Task Group 77.4 (Stump) Reformed from 17 January 1945:

- USS Natoma Bay (CVE-
- USS Marcus Island (CVE-
- USS Savo Island (CVE-
- USS Steamer Bay (CVE-
- USS Petrof Bay (CVE-
- USS Tulagi (CVE-

USN Task Group 77.5 aka Task Unit 77.4.1 (Cronin) Hunter – Killer Group:

- USS Tulagi(CVE-) VC-92

[Salamaua ?]

USN Night Raids on Indochina, Formosa, Hong Kong, and Okinawa (10–25 January 1945) Note: Also attacked shipping. USN Task Force 5/Task Group 38.5: [???]

- USS Enterprise (CV-6)
- USS Essex (CV-9)
- USS Independence (CVL-22)

RN Minelaying and anti-shipping strikes on Norwegian Coast (11–13 January 1945) Operations SPELLBINDER and GRATIS.

RN Force 3:

- HMS Trumpeter (CVE-37/D09)
- HMS Premier (CVE-42/D23)

RN Escort for Russian convoy JW66 and RA66 to/from Kola Inlet (18 Apr – 6 May 1945)

RN:

- HMS Vindex (CVE/D15) Air Squadron 813
- HMS Premier (CVE-42/D23)

RN night air attacks on shipping off Vaagso, Norway (24–30 January 1945) Operation WINDED

RN:

- HMS Premier (CVE-42/D23)
- HMS Campania (CVE/D48)
- HMS Nairana (CVE/D05)

RN Raid on Palembang, Sumatra (24 & 29 January 1945) Reduced fuel outputs of plants at Palembang by 75%, Operation MERIDIAN

RN British Pacific Fleet: RN Force 63: • HMS Illustrious (CV) • HMS Indefatigable (CV) • HMS Indomitable (CV) • HMS Victorious (CV)

RN Landings on Cheduba Island, Burma (25 January 1945) Operation SANKEY

RN Force 64?:

- HMS Ameer (CVE-35/D-01)

RN Convoy Escort for Convoys to/from Kola Inlet (6–27 February 1945) Operation HOTBED; Convoys JW64 and RA64; experienced extreme weather condition;

RN:

- HMS Narana (CVE/D05)
- HMS Campania (CVE/D48) Air Squadron 813

RN Aerial minlaying at Skatestrommen, Norway (11–13 February 1945) Operation SELENIUM

RN Force 2:

- HMS Premier (CVE-42/D23)
- HMS Puncher (CVE-53

USN Raids on Tokyo (16–17 February 1945) Task Force 58 (Spruance/Mitscher):

- USS Enterprise (CV-6)
- USS Saratoga (CV-3)
- 11 fleet carriers
- 5 light carriers

USN Raids on Tokyo (16–26 Feb – 1944) Operation JAMBOREE USN Task Force 58/Fifth Fleet ((Mitscher/Spruance): 45/02/16 strike Tokyo area – start operation 45/02/17 strike Tokio, Jokohama – Tachikawa motor factory, Kasumigaura 45/02/21 strike Tokio 45/02/24 strike Tokio 45/02/25 strike Tokio 45/02/26 strike Tokio, Hacino Is., Nagoja 45/03/03 58.5 strike Cicijima WHICH CARRIERS? SAME ONES SUPPORTING IWO JIMA INVASION?

Invasion of Iwo Jima and Chichi Jima (19 Feb – 26 March 1945) USN Operation DETACHMENT USN Task Force 58/Fifth Fleet ((Mitscher/Spruance): USN Task Group 58.1: USN Task Unit 58.1.1? – Carrier Unit ComCarDiv5:

- USS Bennington (CV-20)
- USS Wasp (CV-18) CVG-81
- USS Hornet (CV-12)
- USS Belleau Wood (CVL-24) CVG-30

USN Task Group 58.2: USN Task Unit 58.2.? – Carrier Unit

- USS Lexington (CV-16) CVG-9
- USS Hancock (CV-19) CVG-80
- USS Enterprise (CV-6) CVG(N)-90: From 21 Feb
- USS San Jacinto (CVL-3)

USN Task Group 58.3: USN Task Unit 58.3.? – Carrier Unit:

  - USS Essex (CV-9)
- USS Bunker Hill (CV-17) From 15 Feb
- USS Cowpens (CVL-25)

USN Task Group 58.4: USN Task Unit 58.4.? – Carrier Unit:

- USS Yorktown (CV-10)
- USS Randolph (CV-15) CVG-12
- USS Langley (CVL-27) Damaged by bomb 21 Feb
- USS Cabot (CVL-28)

USN Task Group 58.5:

  - USS Enterprise (CV-6) CVG(N)-90; ADDED 23 FEB [DOUBLE COUNTED?]
  - USS Saratoga (CV-3) damaged by 7 bombs from land-based aircraft

USN Task Force 50: USN Task Group 50.7 – Antisubmarine Group USN Task Unit 50.7.1

- USS Anzio (CVE-57) Air Squadron VC-82

USN Task Unit 50.7.3:

- USS Tulagi (CVE-72) Air Squadron VC-92; Replenishment Aircraft for TG-52.2 and TG-58

USN Task Group 50.8 – At Sea Logistic Support Group Replenishment ships:

- USS Sitkoh Bay (CVE-86)
- USS Windham Bay (CVE-92)
- USS Admiralty Islands (CVE-99) 16 Feb – 2 Mar
- USS Bougainville (CVE-100)
- USS Attu (CVE-102)

Covering ships:

- USS Shamrock Bay (CVE-84)
- USS Makassar Strait (CVE-91)

USN Task Group 52.2 – Support Carrier Group (Durgin): USN Task Unit 52.2.1 CarDiv26 (Sprague):

- USS Natoma Bay (CVE-62) VC-81
- USS Wake Island (CVE-65) VOC-1
- USS Petrof Bay (CVE-80) VC-76)
- USS Sargent Bay (CVE-83) VC-83
- USS Steamer Bay (CVE-87) VC-90

USN Task Unit 52.2.2 CarDiv29 (Durgin):

- USS Makin Island (CVE-93) VC-84
- USS Lunga Point (CVE-94) VC-85
- USS Bismarck Sea (CVE-95 VC-86

USN Task Unit 52.2.3 Cardiv25 (Henderson):

- USS Rudyerd Bay (CVE-81) VC-77
- USS Saginaw Bay (CVE-82) VC-88

WATCH OUT FOR DOUBLE COUNTING USN Task Unit 52.2.3 from 45/03/08:

- USS Saginaw Bay (CVE-82) VC-88)
- USS Wake Island (CVE-65) VOC-1
- USS Tulagi (CVE-72) VC-92

USN Task Unit 52.2.4 (Moebus) – attached 45/02/21

- USS Saratoga (CV-3) until 22 Feb
- USS Enterprise (CV-6) from 22 Feb

RN 30th Aircraft Carrier Squadron at Sydney, Australia for service in Fleet Train (as of 22 February 1945)

RN Task Force 112:

- HMS Slinger (CVE-32/D26/R313)
- HMS Speaker (CVE-40/D90/R314)
- HMS Ruler (CVE-50/D-72/A731))
- HMS Striker (CVE-19/D12)
- HMS Chaser (CVE-10/D32)

RN aerial minelaying and air strikes at Karm Sound, Norway (22 February 1945) Operation GROUNDSHEET

RN Force 4:

- HMS Premier (CVE-42/D23)
- HMS Puncher (CVE-53

RN Photo-reconnaissance flights over Malaya (26 Feb – 7 March 1945) Operation STACEY

RN Force 64:

- HMS Ameer (CVE-35/D-01)
- HMS Empress (CVE-38/D42)

RN Operations Clearing the Indian Ocean (Mar – September 1945) Operations DRACULA, DUKEDOM, COLLIE, ZIPPER, JURIST

RN Eastern Fleet/Force 61/East Indies Fleet (21st Aircraft Carrier Squadron) based at Trincomalee as of 7 July 1945:

- HMS Emperor (CVE-34/D98/R307)
- HMS Begum (CVE-36/D38/R305)
- HMS Empress (CVE-38/D42)
- HMS Shah (CVE-43/D21/R312)
- HMS Ameer (CVE-35/D01/R302)
- HMS Khedive (CVE-39/D62)
- HMS Slinger (CVE-32/D26/R313)
- HMS Speaker (CVE-40/D90/R314)
- HMS Hunter (CVE-8/D80)
- HMS Attacker (CVE-7/D02)
- HMS Pursuer (CVE-17/D73)
- HMS Searcher (CVE-22/D40)
- HMS Smiter (CVE-52/D55/R321)
- HMS Stalker (CVE-15/D91)
- HMS Trumpeter (CVE-37/D09/R318)

USN Raids on Okinawa (1 Mar – ? 1945)

USN Task Force 58

RN Escort for Russian Convoys JW65 and RA65 (15–30 March 1945) Operation SCOTTISH

RN:

- HMS Trumpeter (CVE-37/D09)
- HMS Campania (CVE/D48) Air Squadron 825

USN Raids on Kyushu and Inland Sea (16–19 March 1945) UNS Task Force 58 (Spruance/Mitscher) Note: First USN attacks on Inland Sea area, by at least 240 USN aircraft, was made on 19 March 1945. Note: " Task Groups 58.1, 58.3 and 58.4 were to attack Kure, and Task Group 58.2 was to strike Kobe."

- USS Enterprise (CV-6) light damage
- USS Intrepid (CV-11) light damage [HMS???]
- USS Yorktown (CV-10) damaged by a bomb
- USS Wasp (CV-18) damaged by a bomb
- USS Franklin (CV-13) damaged by two bombs
- USS Bunker Hill (CV-17)
- 15 carriers total in 4 task groups

IJN:

- IJN Amagi (CV) damaged by bombs while at anchor in the Inland Sea
- IJN Katsuragi (CV) damaged by bombs while at anchor in the Inland Sea
- IJN Ryuho (CVL) damaged by bombs and rockets
- IJN Kaiyo (CVE) damaged by a bomb
- IJN Hyuga (BBV)
- IJN ISE (BBV)

RN aerial minelaying and air strikes at Askevold, Norway (20–21 March 1945) Operation CUPOLA

RN Force 1:

- HMS Premier (CVE-42/D23)
- HMS Seacher (CVE-22/D40)
- HMS Queen (CVE-49/D19/R320)

RN Raids on Shipping off Trondheim and Alesund, Norway (26–29 March 1945) Operation PREFIX

RN:

- HMS Searcher (CVE-22/D-40)
- HMS Queen (CVE-49/D19/R320)
- HMS Nairana (CVE/D05)
- HMS Puncher (CVE-53/D79)

RN air attack on U-Boat Depot Ships at Kilbotn (6 April 1945) Operation NEWMARKET

RN:

- HMS Queen (CVE-49/D19/R320)
- HMS Puncher (CVE-53/D79)
- HMS Searcher (CVE-22/D-40)
- HMS Trumpeter (CVE-37/D09/R318)

RN photo-reconnaissance flights and strikes on Sumatra(14–16 April 1945) Operation SUNFISH

RN Force 63, Group 2 of Eastern Fleet:

- HMS Khedive (CVE-39/D62)

RN Russian Convoy Escort for JW66 and RA66(18-2 April 1945) Operations ROUNDEL and TRAMMEL; last set of Russian Convoys

RN:

- HMS Premier (CVE-42/D23)
- HMS Vindex (CVE/D15)

RN Raid on Nicobar and Port Blair in the Andamans, to provide cover for landings at Rangoon (27–30 April 1945) Operation BISHOP

RN Task Force 63:

- HMS Empress (CVE-38/D42)
- HMS Shah (CVE-43/D21)

USN Invasion of Okinawa (before 7 April 1945) USN Operation ICEBERG (Halsey?/Mitscher) USN Task Force 58 (Mitscher):

- USS Monterey (CVL-26)

USN Task Group 58.1 (Clark):

- USS Hornet (CV-12)
- USS Bennington (CV-20)
- USS Wasp (CV-18) Until 19 March
- USS Belleau Wood (CVL-24)
- USS San Jacinto (CVL-30)

USN Task Group 58.2 (Davison) Disjoined 20 March to 8 April 1945

- USS Franklin (CV-13) Until 19 March
- USS Randolph (CV-15)

USN Task Group 58.3 (Sherman):

- USS Essex (CV-9)
- USS Bunker Hill (CV-17)
- USS Hancock (CV-19) Until 9 April
- USS Bataan (CVL-29)
- USS Cabot (CVL-28) Until ? May

USN Task Group 58.4 (Radford):

- USS Enterprise (CV-6) Until 18 March then from 5–8 April
- USS Yorktown (CV-10) CVG-9
- USS Intrepid (CV-11) CVG-10
- USS Langley (CVL-27)
- USS Independence (CVL-22)

[WHAT ABOUT CVEs??]

USN Invasion of Okinawa (after 7 April 1945 and until 25 May 1945 TF-58?) USN Operation ICEBERG (Halsey?/Mitscher) USN Task Force 58 (Mitscher): USN Task Group 58.1 (Clark):

- USS Hornet (CV-12)
- USS Bennington (CV-20)
- USS Belleau Wood (CVL-24)
- USS San Jacinto (CVL-30)

USN Task Group 58.2 (Davison) Disjoined 16 April

- USS Enterprise (CV-6) April 18-10?
- USS Randolph (CV-15)
- USS Independence (CVL-22)

USN Task Group 58.3 (Sherman): USN Task Unit 58.3.1 – Carrier Unit

- USS Essex (CV-9)
- USS Bunker Hill (CV-17) Until 11 May
- USS Enterprise (CV-6) April 18-10? 04/10-04/14, 05/06-05/16??
- USS Randolph (CV-15) From 16 April
- USS Bataan (CVL-29) Detaches 17–2 April
- USS Langley (CVL-27) 10–11 May
- USS Monterey (CVL-26) 12–28 May

USN Task Unit 58.3.10 9–11 April:

- USS Hancock (CV-19)
- USS Cabot (CVL-28)

USN Task Group 58.4 (Radford)

- USS Intrepid (CV-11)
- USS Yorktown (CV-10)
- USS Enterprise (CV-6)K From 10 April
- USS Shangri-La (CV-38) From 24 April
- USS Ticonderoga (CV-14) CVG-87 From 22 May
- USS Bon Homme Richard (CV-31) From 6 June
- USS Langley (CVL-27)
- USS Independence (CVL-22) From 16 April

[WHAT ABOUT CVEs??] [45/05/28 TF 58 > TF 38]

USN Invasion of Okinawa (After 28 May 1945 to TF 38) 1 Apr – 22 June 1945) USN Operation ICEBERG USN Task Force 38:

- USS Bon Homme Richard (CV-31) From 6 June
- USS Independence (CVL-22)
- USS Monterey (CVL-26)

USN Task Group 38.1:

- USS Hornet (CV-12)
- USS Bennington (CV-20)
- USS Belleau Wood (CVL-24)
- USS San Jacinto (CVL-30)

USN Task Group 38.3:

- USS Essex (CV-9)

USN Task Group 38.4:

- USS Shangri-La (CV-38)
- USS Yorktown (CV-10)
- USS Ticonderoga (CV-14)

USN Task Force 30- Okinawa Covering Force (28 May – 17 June 1945) USN Task Group 30.7- Antisubmarine Warfare Group:

- USS Anzio (CVE-57)
- USS Tulagi (CVE-72)

USN Task Group 30.8- Logistic Support Group (ServRon6):

- USS Block Island (CVE-21) until 16 June
- USS Windham Bay (CVE-92)
- USS Salamaua (CVE-96) 4–6 June
- USS Admiralty Islands (CVE-99) until 15 June
- USS Bougainville (CVE-100)

USN Task Force 32: USN Task Group 32.1 – Support Carrier Group

- USS Sargent Bay (CVE-83) From 2 June
- USS Shipley Bay (CVE-85) 6–22 June
- USS Salamaua (CVE-96) Until 4 June

USN Task Unit 32.1.1:

- USS Shamrock Bay (CVE-84) From 31 May
- USS Makin Island (CVE-93) Until 1 June
- USS Lunga Point (CVE-94)
- USS Natoma Bay (CVE-62)

USN Task Unit 32.1.3:

- USS Gilbert Islands (CVE-107) Until 16 June
- USS Hoggatt Bay (CVE-75)
- USS Steamer Bay (CVE-87) Air Squadron VC-93; 15–22 June
- USS Block Island (CVE-106)

USN Task Group 50.7 – Antisubmarine Warfare Group

- USS Anzio (CVE-57) 22 Mar – 30 April 1945 & from 21 May 1945
- USS Tulagi (CVE-72)

USN Task Group 50.8 – At Sea Logistic Support Group (ServRon6): [DUPLICATION WITH TASK FORCE 30 AND THEIR GROUPS. NEED TO SORT THIS OUT.]

- USS Savo Island (CVE-78) 7–16 Apr
- USS Rudyerd Bay (CVE-81) 17–27 Apr; Attached from 52.1 7 Apr

USN Task Unit 50.8.4 – CVE Plane Transport Unit

- USS Windham Bay (CVE-92)
- USS Admiralty Islands (CVE-99)
- USS Bougainville (CVE- 100)
- USS Attu (CVE-102)

USN Task Unit 50.8.13:

- USS Shamrock Bay (CVE-84) Detached to 52.1.1 7 Apr; Air Squadron VC-94

Task Unit 50.8.23:

- USS Makassar Strait (CVE-91) Detached 7 Apr to 52.1.2; Air Squadron VC-97

Task Unit 52.1.1

- USS Makin Island (CVE-93) Air Squadron VC-84
- USS Fanshaw Bay (CVE-70) Air Squadron VOC-2
- USS Lunga Point (CVE-94) Air Squadron VC-85
- USS Natoma Bay (CVE-62) Air Squadron VC-9; Detached 17 Apr – 8 May
- USS Savo Island (CVE-78) Air Squadron VC-91; Detached to 50.8 on 7 Apr
- USS Steamer Bay (CVE-87) Air Squadron VC-90
- USS Anzio (CVE-57) Air Squadron VC-13); Antisubmarine Warfare
- USS Shamrock Bay (CVE-84) Air Squadron VC-94; 04/07; Attached 7 Apr from TG-50.8
- USS Hoggatt Bay (CVE-75) Joined 8 May

Task Unit 52.1.2 ComCarDiv24:

- USS Marcus Island (CVE-77) Air Squadron VC-87) Until 29 Apr
- USS Saginaw Bay (CVE-82) Air Squadron VC-88)
- USS Sargent Bay (CVE-83) Air Squadron VC-83; Detached to TG-50.8 7–18 Apr
- USS Petrof Bay (CVE-80) Air Squadron VC-93
- USS Rudyerd Bay (CVE-81) Air Squadron VC-96; Detached to TG-50.8 17–27 Apr
- USS Wake Island (CVE-65) Air Squadron VOC-1 Until 3 Apr
- USS Tulagi (CVE-72) Air Squadron VC-92; Antisubmarine Warfare
- USS Makassar Strait (CVE-91) Attached 7 Apr – 7 May

Task Unit 52.1.3 ComCarDiv22:

- USS Suwannee (CVE-27) CVEG-40: Air Squadrons VF-40, VT-40
- USS Sangamon (CVE-26) CVEG-33: Air Squadrons VF-33, VT-33
- USS Chenango (CVE-28) CVEG-25: Air Squadrons VF-25, VT-25
- USS Santee (CVE-29) CVEG-24: Air Squadrons VF-24, VT-24
- USS Block Island (CVE-21) (MCVG-1: VMF-511, VMTB-233) from 5 May
- USS Gilbert Islands (CVE-107) (MCVG-2: VMF-512, VMTB-143) from 21 May

USN SpecEscCarGrp – Special Escort Carrier Group [TF?] Transported 192 F4Us and 30 F6Fs of MAG-31 & MAG-33:

- USS Sitkoh Bay (CVE-86) Transported Marine Aircraft Group 31 (MAG-31)
- USS Breton (CVE-23) Transported Marine Aircraft Group 31 (MAG-31)
- USS Hollandia (CVE-97) Transported Marine Aviation Training Support Group 33 (MAG-33)
- USS White Plains (CVE-66) Transported Marine Aviation Training Support Group 33 (MAG-33)

RN British Pacific Fleet Strikes on Sakishima Islands, Ishigaki Island, and Formosa (Apr – May 1945) Operation ICEBERG Task Force 57 (Apr – May 1945): USN Task Group 57.2 CarRon1

- HMS Indomitable (CV-92); Hit by kamikaze 4 May
- HMS Victorious (CV-38); Hit by kamikaze 9 May
- HMS Indefatigable (CV-R10) Hit by kamikaze 1 Apr
- HMS Illustrious (CV-87) From 15 Apr
- HMS Formidable (CV-67) From 15 Apr; Hit by kamikaze 4 May and 9 May

[45/05/28 TF 57 > TF 37]

RN British Pacific Fleet Logistical Support (May 1945) Operation ICEBERG I Task Force 112- Fleet Train supporting Task Force 57 (Fisher)

- HMS Chaser (CVE-10/D32)
- HMS Fencer (CVE-14/D64)
- HMS Ruler (CVE-50/D72/A731) Air Squadron 885?
- HMS Slinger (CVE-32/D26)

Task Group 112.2: Task Unit 112.2.1 17 Apr:

- HMS Striker (CVE-19/D12)

Task Unit 112.2.5 45/04/17:

- HMS Speaker (CVE-40/D90/R314) provided air cover for ships of BPF and Fleet Train during replenishment

Task Unit 112.2.6: HMS Indefatigable (CV- 19–20 July HMS Arbiter (CVE HMS Striker (CVE [DOUBLE COUNTED?]

[MORE MISC INFO ON OPERATION ICEBERG TO BE INTEGRATED ABOVE] [USN/RN Invasion of Okinawa (1 Apr – 22 June) USN Operation ICEBERG 12 ships lost to kamikaze attacks USN Fifth Fleet: USN Task Force 50: USN Task Force 58: (took part in all USN battles during the last two years of the war) 11 fleet carriers, 6 light carriers, 22 escort carriers USN/RN Task Force 57 (BPF): 5 fleet carriers] [WHAT IS ICEBERG II VS ICEBERG I??]

RN Raids on shipping and U-boat base at Kilbotn, Norway (4 May 1945) Operation JUDGMENT (1945) Last offensive operation by Home Fleet during the war; submarine Depot Ship and U-711 sunk, the last U-Boat sunk by aircraft of the Fleet Air Arm aircraft during the war.

RN Home Fleet Task Force:

- HMS Searcher (CVE-22/D40)
- HMS Queen (CVE-49/D19/R320)
- HMS Trumpeter (CVE-37/D09)

RN at Copenhagen for Surrender of German Warships (9 May 1945) Operation CLEAVER

RN:

- HMS Searcher (CVE-22/D40)
- HMS Queen (CVE-49/D19/R320)
- HMS Trumpeter (CVE-37/D09)

RN intercept Japanese craft evacuating troops from Andaman Islands (10–19 May 1945) Operation DUKEDOM

RN Force 61:

- HMS Khedive (CVE-39/D62)
- HMS Hunter (CVE-
- HMS Shah (CVE-
- HMS Emperor (CVE-

RN Escort for Russian convoy JW67 and RA67 to/from Kola Inlet (12–30 May 1944) Operation TIMELESS; last set of Russian convoys;

RN 4th Escort Group:

- HMS Queen (CVE-49/D19/R320) Air Squadron 853

RN patrol for Japanese warships in Indian Ocean (14–16 May) Operation MITRE; destroyers from group sank cruiser IJN Haguro

RN:

- HMS Hunter (CVE-8/D80)
- HMS Emperor (CVE-34/D98/R307) Air Squadron 851

USN ?

USN Task Force?:

- USS Enterprise (CV-6) damaged by kamikazes twice
- USS Essex (CV-9)

RN aircraft transport from India to Cylon (June – July 1945)

- HMS Hunter (CVE-8/D80)
- HMS Attacker (CVE-7/D02)

USN Raids on Kyushu (2–8 June 1945) USN Operation Iceberg USN Task Force 38 (Halsey/McCain): USN:

- USS

USN caught in typhoon (4 June 1945)

USN: Hornet (22-54N, 132-25E), Bennington (23-03N, 132-04E), Belleau Wood (22-45N, 132-10E), San Jacinto (22-53N, 131-55E)

RN Raid on Truk (14–15 June 1945) Operation INMATE Task Force 111: Task Group 111.2 (Brind)

- HMS Implacable (CV/86)
- HMS Ruler (CVE-50/D72/A731)

RN Reconnaissance missions over southern Malaya and attacks on airfields in northern Sumatra. (14–20 June 1945) Operation BALSAM

RN Force 63 (Oliver):

- HMS Ameer (CVE-35/D01)
- HMS Khedive (CVE-39/D62)
- HMS Stalker (CVE-15/D12)

USN Raid (6th) on Wake Island (20 June 1945) USN Task Force 12, Task Group 12.4:

- USS Hancock (CV-19)
- USS Lexington (CV-16)
- USS Cowpens (CVL-25)

USN Raids on Home Islands (July – August 1945)

- USS Wasp (CV-18) From 26 July
- USS Independence (CVL-22)

USN Task Group 38.1:

- USS Lexington (CV-16)
- USS Hancock (CV-19)
- USS Bennington (CV-20)
- USS Belleau Wood (CVL-24)
- USS San Jacinto (CVL-30)

USN Task Group 38.2:

- ?

USN Task Group 38.3:

- USS Essex (CV-9)
- USS Ticonderoga (CV-14)
- USS Randolph (CV-15)
- USS Monterey (CVL-26)
- USS Cabot (CVL-28)
- USS Bataan (CVL-29)

USN Task Group 38.4:

- USS Essex (CV-9) From 20 Aug
- USS Shangri-La (CV-38)
- USS Yorktown (CV-10)
- USS Bon Homme Richard (CV-31)
- USS Cowpens (CVL-25)

USN Task Group 38.5 – 45/08/13 – British Pacific Fleet

- HMS Indefatigable (R10) [DOUBLE COUNTED? SEE TF-37, BELOW]

[SEE MORE INFO RE SPECIFIC RAIDS AT valka.] USN Task Force 37- The British Pacific Fleet (July – August 1945):

- HMS Formidable (67) Air Squadrons 1841, 1842, 1848, and 848.
- HMS Victorious (38) Air Squadrons 1834, 1836, and 849.
- HMS Indefatigable (R10) Air Squadrons 887, 894, 1772, and 820.
- HMS Implacable (86) Air Squadrons 801, 880, 1771, and 828.

USN Task Force 30: USN Task Group 30.7- Antisubmarine Warfare Group:

- USS Anzio (CVE-57) Squadron VC-13

USN Task Group 30.8- Third Fleet Logistical Group:

- USS Chenango (CVE-28) 26 July – ?
- USS Anzio (CVE-57) 6 July – 19 Aug
- USS Kitkun Bay (CVE-71) Until 15 Aug
- USS Nehenta Bay (CVE-74)
- USS Sitkoh Bay (CVE-86) 25 Aug – 5 Sept
- USS Steamer Bay (CVE-87) 3 July – 21 July
- USS Thetis Bay (CVE-90)
- USS Hollandia (CVE-97)
- USS Admiralty Islands (CVE-99) 29 June – 21 July)
- USS Roi (CVE-103)
- USS Munda (CVE-104) From 20 July
- USS Gilbert Islands (CVE-107)

RN BPF RAIDS ON HOME ISLANDS??

RN Replacement carriers supporting BPF operations off Japan (20 July – 13 August 1945)

RN:

- HMS Striker (CVE-19/D12)
- HMS Ruler (CVE-50/D72/A731)
- HMS Speaker (CVE-40/D90/R314)
- HMS Arbiter (CVE-51/D31/R303)
- HMS Chaser (CVE-10/D32)

RN cover for a major minesweeping operation off Nicobar and to carry out attacks by embarked aircraft on airfields in North Sumatra (2 July 1945) Operation COLLIE

RN Force 61:

- HMS Ameer (CVE-35/D-01)
- HMS Emperor (CVE-34/D-98)

RN air cover and strikes during bombardments Nicobar Islands (9–10 July)

RN Force 61?:

- HMS Ameer (CVE-35/D-01)

USN Raid on Tokyo (10 July 1945) USN Task Force 38 (Halsey/McCain) ~1,000 aircraft:

- 9 fleet carriers
- 6 light carriers

USN Raids on Hokkaido and Northern Honshu (14–15 July 1945) USN Task Force 38 (Halsey/McCain)

USN & RN Raid on Yokosuka (17–18 July 1945) USN Task Force 38 (Halsey/McCain)

- ?

USN Task Force 37 British Pacific Fleet:

- HMS Formidable (67) Air Squadrons 1841, 1842, 1848, and 848.
- HMS Victorious (38) Air Squadrons 1834, 1836, and 849.
- HMS Indefatigable (R10) Air Squadrons 887, 894, 1772, and 820.
- HMS Implacable (86) Air Squadrons 801, 880, 1771, and 828.

USN & RN Raids on Kure and the Inland Sea Area (24–28 July 1945) USN Task Force 38 (Halsey/McCain) attacked Kure:

- USS Essex (CV-9)
- USS Ticonderoga (CV-14)
- USS Randolf (CV-15)
- USS Hancock (CV-19)
- USS Bennington (CV-20)
- USS Monterey (CV-26)
- USS Bataan (CVL-29)
- USS Jacinto (CVL-30)

USN Task Force 37 (British Pacific Fleet) attacked Kure:

- HMS Formidable (67) Air Squadrons 1841, 1842, 1848, and 848.
- HMS Victorious (38) Air Squadrons 1834, 1836, and 849.
- HMS Indefatigable (R10) Air Squadrons 887, 894, 1772, and 820.
- HMS Implacable (86) Air Squadrons 801, 880, 1771, and 828.

RN Task Force 57 (admiral?) attacked Osaka:

- HMS Formidable (67)
- HMS Indefatigable (R10)
- HMS Victorious (R38)

IJN:

- IJN Amagi (CV) damaged by bombs while at anchor in the Inland Sea
- IJN Katsuragi (CV) damaged by bombs while at anchor in the Inland Sea
- IJN Ryūhō (CVL)
- IJN Kaiyo (CVE) damaged
- IJN Hyūga (BBV) damaged
- IJN Ise (BBV) damaged

["Sank one carrier"(?)]

RN air strikes on airfields at Kota Raja and Lho Nga, NW Sumatra. (11 July 1945)

RN Force 61?:

- HMS Ameer (CVE-35/D-73)
- HMS Emperor (CVE-34/D98)

RN cover minesweeping operation off Phuket Island on Kra Isthmus. (19–26 July 1945) Operation LIVERY last offensive operation by the East Indies Fleet during the war

RN Force 63:

- HMS Ameer (CVE-35/D-73)
- HMS Emperor (CVE-34/D98)

USN Raid (7th) on Wake Island (1 August 1945)

USN Task Force 12, Task Group 12.3:

- USS Cabot (CVL-28)

USN Raid on Tokyo (13–15 August 1945) USN Task Force 38 (Spurance/Mitscher)

USN Task Force 44-Northern Honshu & Hokkaido Surrender Force (Aug 1945):

- USS Manila Bay (CVE-61)
- USS Fanshaw Bay (CVE-70)
- USS Kitkun Bay (CVE-71)
- USS Nehenta Bay (CVE-74)
- USS Hoggatt Bay (CVE-75)
- USS Savo Island (CVE-78) From 15 Aug

RN landings in Malaya (28 Aug – 3 September 1945) Operation JURIST part of Operation ZIPPER

RN (Walker):

- HMS Khedive (CVE-39/D62)
- HMS Hunter (CVE-8/D80)
- HMs Stalker (CVE-15/D91)
- HMS Archer (CVE/BAVG-1/D78)
- HMS Emperor (CVE-34/D98/R307)
- HMS Pursuer (CVE-17/D73)

USN Occupation Duty (Sept 1945) Task Force 72:

- CarDiv 5

RN Landings at Singapore () Operation TIDERACE part of Operation ZIPPER

RN:

- HMS HMS Ameer (CVE-35/D01/R302)
- HMS Attacker (CVE-7/D02)
- HMS Emperor (CVE-34/D98/R307)
- HMS Empress (CVE-38/D42)
- HMS Hunter (CVE-8/D80)
- HMS Khedive (CVE-39/D62)
- HMS Stalker (CVE-15/D91)

USN Returning Servicemen Home (after September 1945) USN Operation Magic Carpet

- USS Saratoga (CV-3)
- USS Enterprise (CV-6)

IJN Returning Servicemen Home'

- IJN Hōshō (CVL)
- IJN Katsuragi (CV)
