= USS Pike =

Three United States Navy ships have borne the name USS Pike.

- USS General Pike (1813) was a wooden freshwater corvette built in Sackett's Harbor in 1813. She saw action on Lake Ontario against the Royal Navy during the War of 1812.
- USS Pike (SS-6) was a Plunger-class submarine commissioned 1903.
- USS Pike (SS-173) was a Porpoise-class submarine commissioned in 1935.
