= Operation Calendar =

Military operation of World War II

- Part of the Battle of the Mediterranean of the Second World War
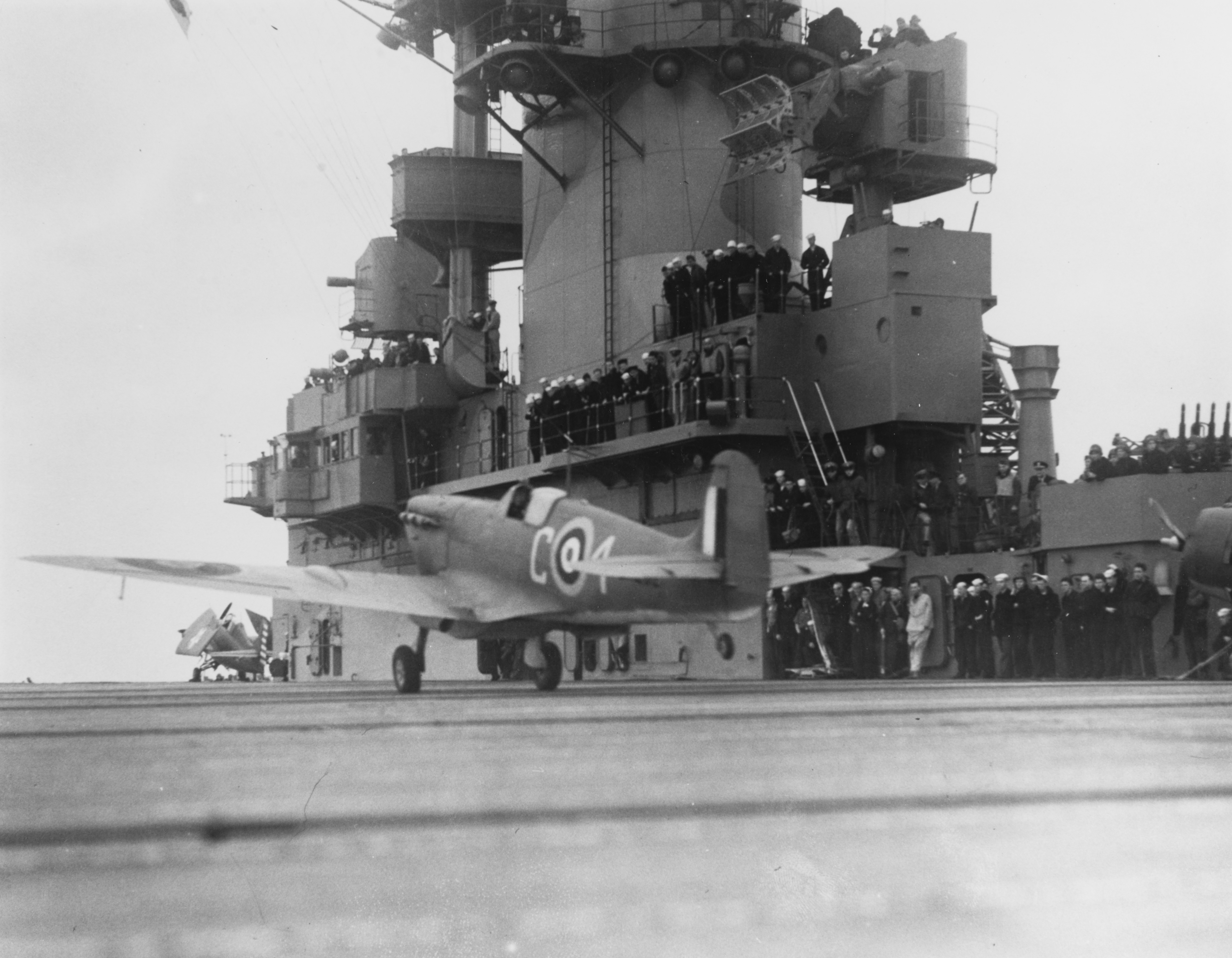
- A Spitfire takes off from USS Wasp.
- Operational scope: Operational
- Planned by: Air Ministry, Royal Air Force, Royal Navy, US Navy
- Objective: Reinforcement of Malta with Spitfire fighters
- Date: 14–26 April 1942
- Executed by: United States; United Kingdom
- Outcome: Spitfires were shot down or damaged on the ground soon after they arrived
- Casualties: 1 pilot failed to arrive

Operation Calendar (14–26 April 1942) was an Anglo–American operation in the Second World War to deliver 52 Supermarine Spitfire fighter aircraft to Malta. Spitfires were necessary to challenge Axis air superiority over Malta because they had the performance that Hurricane fighters lacked. Aircraft carriers were necessary to get fighter aircraft to positions in the western Mediterranean from which they had the range to reach Malta but British aircraft carriers were busy elsewhere, under repair or too small to deliver enough Spitfires to be effective.

USS Wasp was in European waters and was loaned to the British to ferry a large number of Spitfires in one voyage. Wasp picked up the fighters in the Clyde and became part of Force W, to sail to the Strait of Gibraltar, rendezvous with ships from Force H based at Gibraltar, to make a Club Run, in which 48 of the 52 Spitfires were dispatched to Malta and 47 arrived. Massed air raids by the Luftwaffe and Regia Aeronautica led to the rapid destruction or damage to the Spitfires once at Malta. The failure of the Spitfires delivered to Malta led to Wasp making another Club Run in May (Operation Bowery).

== Background ==
=== Intelligence ===
==== Axis ====
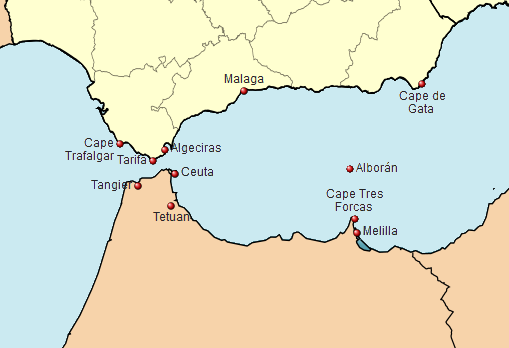
Axis stations watching the Strait of Gibraltar

In the autumn of 1941 Axis intelligence agencies had established eleven stations around Gibraltar, the main one at Algeciras. (Note: Tarifa, Cape Trafalgar, Malaga, Cape de Gata, Tangier, Ceuta, Tetuan, Cape Tres Forcas, Melilla and Alboran Island.) Two of the stations had Spanish agents and others had German and Italians in Spanish uniforms and by early 1942 had gained a fair degree of efficiency. Messages usually reached Berlin within the hour but the British code-breakers at Bletchley Park could decrypt the signals so quickly that the Admiralty knew of a ship arrival at Gibraltar before the authorities there had sent a notification signal. Axis reports were usually accurate enough to name the big ships, except in poor visibility. The Germans began to install infra-red devices and night telescopes, to be more effective in poor weather and in the dark. In Unternehmen Bodden (Operation Bay) buildings were put up on either side of the Strait of Gibraltar for the new apparatuses and were operational by April 1942, the Admiralty having warned on 7 March that ships were likely to be detected at night.

==== British ====
The British on Malta obtained tactical intelligence from the local Royal Air Force (RAF) Y service unit. The Government Code and Cypher School (GC & CS) at Bletchley Park in England was able to decrypt some Luftwaffe operation orders, which showed that the main effort was to be against British airfields on Malta. The decrypts were infrequent because much of the Axis signals traffic was sent by landline and the time needed to decrypt wireless signals precluded their use for early-warning. The exploitation of radio and wireless transmissions by the Y unit was useful but neither it nor the radar on the island could give sufficient warning of air raids. The air superiority enjoyed by the Axis air forces meant that such warning of raids that was possible was of little tactical value. As soon as a supply convoy left Gibraltar or Alexandria, Axis agents reported it, GC & CS gaining a plethora of decrypts from them which the Admiralty could pass on to the local naval commanders on Axis positions, strengths, reconnaissance practices and the equipment and methods of their bombers and torpedo-bombers. Before a Malta convoy, the RAF conducted many photographic sorties, revealing more about Axis air force locations and strengths but this reached only as far as Naples. The authorities in London had a grandstand view but for early warning of attacks, until May 1942, convoys were reliant on aerial patrolling, radar and lookouts.

=== Malta ===
General map of Malta

As Malta began to run short of supplies, Operation MG 1 was mounted to escort Convoy MW 10 from Alexandria on 21 March. The convoy was the subject of a tentative attack by an Italian fleet; the Italians inflicted severe damage on several escorts in the Second Battle of Sirte but the weaker British force fended off the Italian fleet. The attack on the convoy led to its dispersal which caused a delay and it reached Malta in the morning and not at night as planned, leaving the merchant ships exposed to Axis air attack. In the next 48 hours, all the merchant ships were sunk off Malta or at their moorings; barely 5,000 long tons (5,100 t) of supplies were unloaded.

By the end of April 1942, Axis bombing had smashed the docks, ships, aircraft and airfields and the bombers began attacks on army camps, barracks, warehouses and road junctions, the preliminaries of invasion. After 18 April, German bombing suddenly stopped and Italian bombers took over, regularly bombing with small formations of aircraft. During the month, Axis aircraft flew more than 9,500 sorties against 388 by the RAF all but 30 of which were fighter sorties. The British lost 50 aircraft, 20 shot down in combat against 37 Axis losses, during the dropping of 6,700 long tons (6,800 t) of bombs, three times the March figure, 3,000 long tons (3,000 t) falling on the docks, 2,600 long tons (2,600 t) on airfields.

The bombing killed 300 civilians, left 350 people seriously wounded and demolished or damaged 11,450 buildings. Good shelters existed but some of the casualties were caused by delayed-action bombs. Three destroyers, three submarines, three minesweepers, five tugs, a water carrier and a floating crane were sunk in port and more ships damaged. The island continued to function as a staging post but the Axis bombing neutralised Malta as an offensive base. Two boats of the 10th Submarine Flotilla had been sunk, two were damaged in harbour and on 26 April the flotilla was ordered out because of mining by small fast craft, which were undetectable by radar and inaudible during the bombing; the surviving minesweepers were too reduced in numbers to clear the approaches. The governor, Sir William Dobbie had given a deadline of mid-June for the exhaustion of the food on the island and could only be met by the delivery of substantial supplies of food, fuel, ammunition and equipment brought by sea.

=== Malta convoys ===
A supply convoy to Malta in January 1942 lost one of four ships and an escort was sunk by a U-boat; the February convoy suffered the loss of its three merchant ships to aircraft attack. During the March convoy, the escorts were forewarned by a submarine sighting and decrypts from the Italian C 38m coding machine that an Italian fleet had sailed from Taranto, leading to the Second Battle of Sirte on 22 March 1942, the defence of the convoy by the 15th Cruiser Squadron which forced the battleship Littorio, the heavy cruisers Gorizia, Trento, one light cruiser and ten destroyers to turn away, having inflicted little serious damage to the British escorts and none to the convoy. Two of the four merchantmen were sunk by air attack near Malta and the other two were sunk at their moorings when the unloading of their cargoes had barely begun. Despite the ferrying of fighter aircraft to Malta by aircraft carrier, submarines had to be used to ferry aviation fuel.

=== Axis convoys ===
The Axis air offensive against Malta and the losses inflicted on the Mediterranean Fleet by Italian human torpedoes of the Decima Flottiglia MAS and other losses made it much harder for the British to attack convoys to Libya. On 4 January, massed air attacks on Malta coincided with the Italian Operazione M43, six merchant ships crossing from Italy escorted six destroyers and five torpedo boats, a close escort of a battleship, four light cruisers and five destroyers and a distant escort of three battleships, two heavy cruisers and eight destroyers. Intelligence decrypts revealed to the British the timing and route of the battleship convoy, with reconnaissance reports from aircraft. Bombers from Malta and Cyrenaica missed the convoy and Force K in Malta remained in port. The convoy arrived on 5 January, a notable Axis success; British submarine attacks on the convoy on its return journey failed. On 22 January, Operazione T18, another battleship convoy, got four of five ships to Tripoli. On 21 February in Operazione K7, three groups of merchant ships departed Italy with another elaborate battleship escort, a British air attack was defeated by German fighters on 22 February and the convoy arrived the next day. The Italians sent eleven convoys in February, thirteen of the fifteen ships arriving, 58,965 long tons (59,911 t) (99.2 per cent) of the supplies despatched being unloaded; submarines sank three of the eleven ships making the return journey.

Convoy V5 sailed on 7 March from several ports and attacks failed as they did on the return convoy. Operazione Sirio on 15 March brought four merchant ships to Tripoli on 18 March. The Regia Marina had used much of its fuel oil on the battleship convoys, when German oil deliveries had been suspended and the Italians had to return to smaller escort operations. Four ships departed Italian ports on 17 and 18 March, one hitting a mine near Tripoli and the rest arriving, the danger of attacks from Malta having diminished considerably. Fourteen convoys had sailed for Tripoli in March and eighteen of twenty ships survived the journey, 47,588 long tons (48,352 t) of supplies arrived (82.7 per cent). On 4 April, Operazione Lupo six ships in three convoys arrived at Tripoli and Operazione Aprilia delivered six merchantmen on 16 April. The decline of Malta as an offensive base led the British to rely on submarines, which sank a light cruiser and six freighters and RAF bombers from Egypt bombing Libyan ports. In April, 159,389 long tons (161,947 t) of supplies arrived (99.2 per cent).. Italian ships were at their safest from April to mid-July 1942, convoys sailing 50 nmi (58 mi; 93 km) from Malta, escorted by a couple of aircraft.

Italian convoy deliveries to Libya.
	Cargo (tons)	Fuel (tons)	% Loss	Notes
April	102,000	48,000	<1	With Malta suppressed and western Cyrenaica lost, 750 aircraft anti-shipping sorties had little effect on Italian convoys. (Note: This was a higher rate than for the previous three months. Even the new Wellington torpedo-bombers had little fuel left to find ships west of Benghazi. On 14 April an attack by eight Beaufort torpedo-bombers cost five aircraft for no loss to the convoy.)

== Prelude ==
=== Club Runs ===
==== Operation MG 1 ====
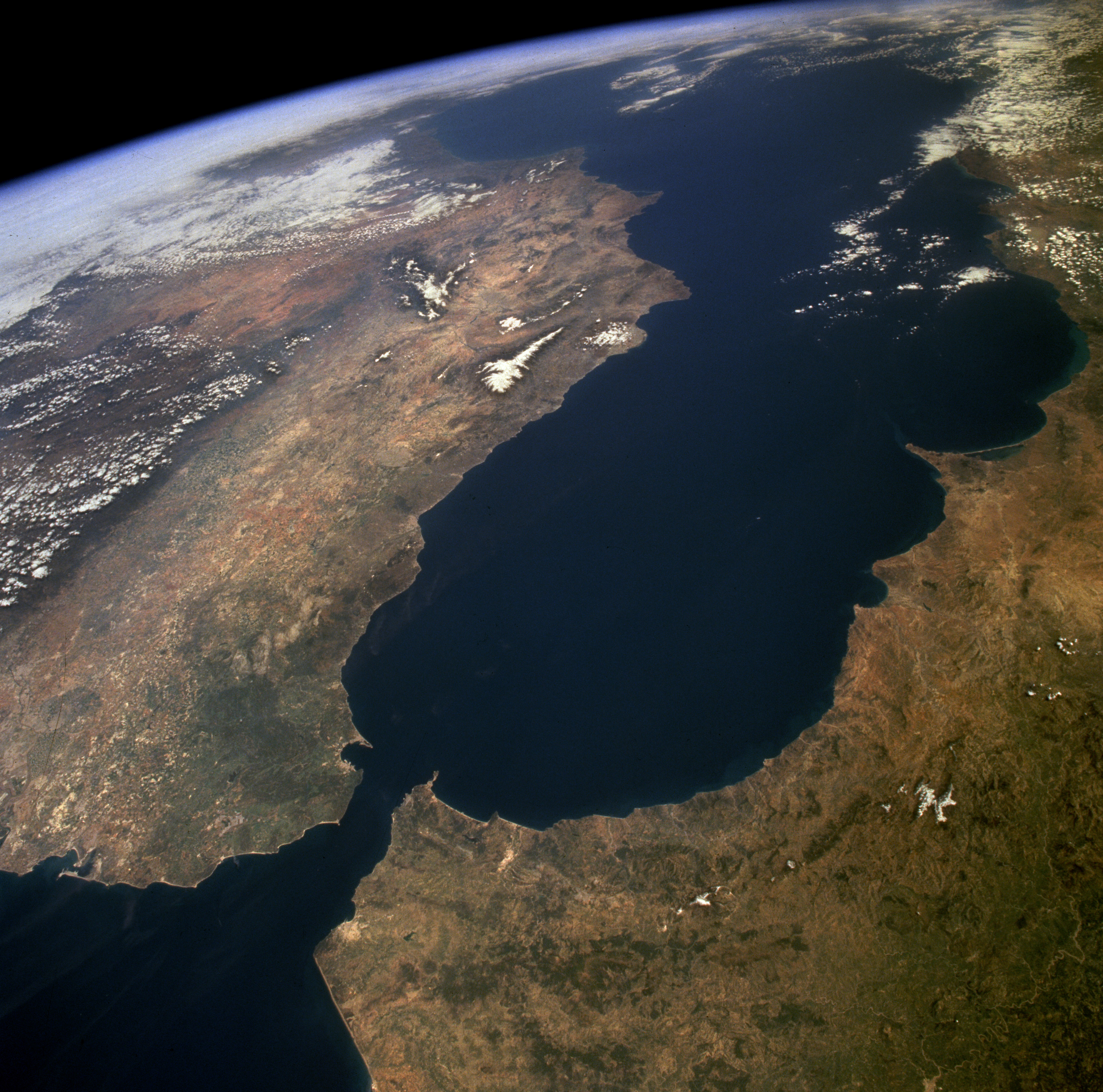
NASA Satellite photograph showing the Strait of Gibraltar and the Alboran Sea

Operation MG 1 (20–26 March) to escort Convoy MW 10 to Malta, succeeded but hardly any of the supplies reaching Malta survived Axis air attacks. Malta had been neutralised as an offensive base by the loss of 126 aircraft on the ground and twenty in the air. The RAF withdrew most of its bombers and reconnaissance aircraft and the Navy evacuated most of its ships; Axis convoys could now be run to Libya against scant opposition. The demands on the Home Fleet for escorts for the Arctic Convoy PQ 16 in May 1942, led Churchill and the War Cabinet to decide that merchant ships could not be risked on Malta convoys until its air defences had been reinforced. The Air Officer Commanding, Air H.Q. Malta, Sir Hugh Lloyd wrote that

Malta's need is for Spitfires, Spitfires and still more Spitfires. And they must come in bulk, not in dribs and drabs.

Recent Club Runs to deliver aircraft from Gibraltar had been dogged by failures and inefficiency; the new 90 imp gal (410 L; 110 US gal) external fuel tanks for Spitfires had proved inadequate, forcing the cancellation of the Club Runs Operation Spotter I and Operation Picket I Club Runs. The deck of HMS Argus was too short for enough Spitfires with long-range tanks to be accommodated, Eagle was in dock for emergency repairs and the fleet carriers had lifts that were too narrow for the wingspan of Spitfires or were busy in the Indian Ocean. (Note: From 8 to 21 April, longitudinal girders were replaced under the steering gear, rubber glands were re-packed and 418 rivets were replaced around the rudder. During 1942 Eagle made nine Spitfire Club Runs.) Churchill made a request to the US president, Franklin D. Roosevelt, for the use of the American aircraft carrier, USS Wasp (Captain John W. Reeves, Jr.), that was in British waters, which Roosevelt granted.

=== Royal Air Force ===
The RAF had chosen aircrew for previous Spitfire reinforcements to Malta according to availability. For Operation Calendar, 601 (County of London) Squadron (Squadron Leader John Bisdee) and 603 (City of Edinburgh) Squadron (Squadron Leader Lord David Douglas-Hamilton) were chosen. The Spitfires flew from RAF Prestwick to the airstrip at RAF Renfrew.

== Operation Calendar ==
=== 14–16 April 1942 ===
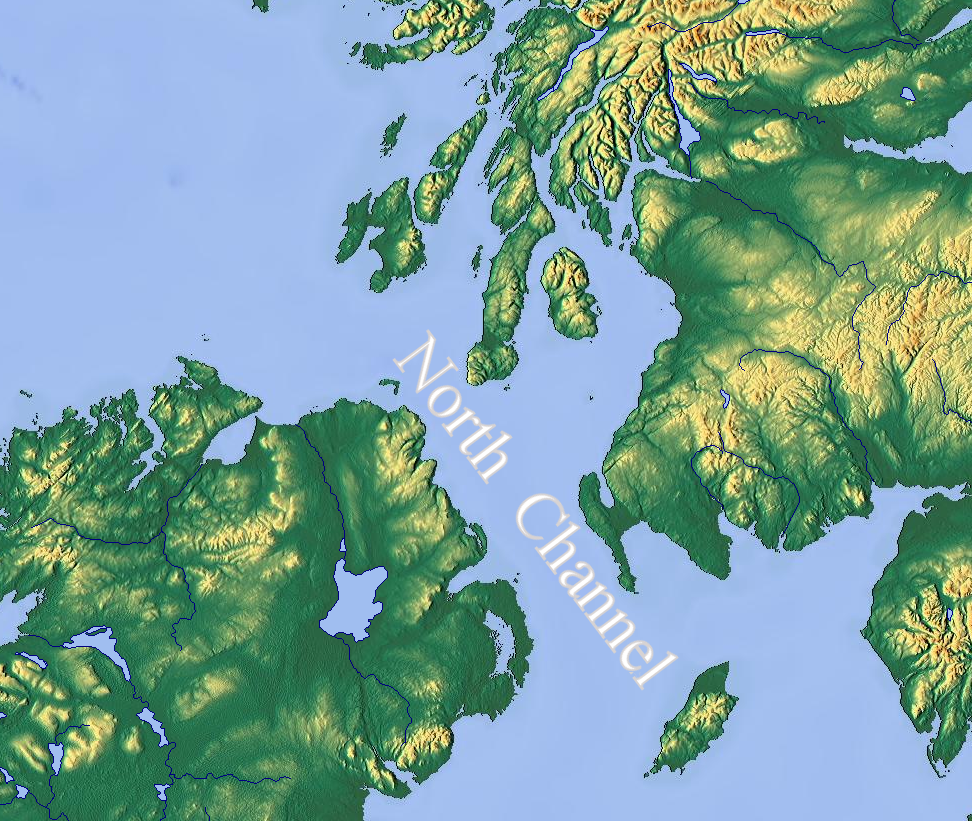
Route through the North Channel, west-about Ireland

Wasp and its destroyers USS Lang and Madison sailed for the River Clyde, cheered on by crowds of civilians and the workers at the John Brown shipyards. By 14 April, Wasp had taken on 52 Spitfires Mk Vc (trop) at King George V dock at Shieldhall. To make room for the Spitfires, the F4F-3 Wildcat fighters of VF-71 were accommodated on the flight deck. Wasp and its destroyers sailed that day and were joined by the British battlecruiser HMS Renown (Commodore Charles Daniel) and the destroyers HMS Inglefield, Ithuriel, Echo and Partridge, forming Force W. The ships sailed west-about Ireland and then southwards for the Bay of Biscay.

Each aircraft had four 20 mm Hispano cannon, four .303 Browning machine-guns and a Vokes filter, along with the new 90-gallon slipper tanks. The RAF embarkation authorities in Scotland had carried out a very careless job, 90 per cent of the Spitfires' long-range fuel tanks were found to be defective, as they had been on Operation Spotter, ill-fitting and leaking large amounts of fuel, which was siphoned off into the slipstream instead of flowing into the engine, leaking fuel all over the deck of Wasp requiring much remedial work. The guns of 95 per cent of the Spitfires were not harmonised, were dirty and incapable of firing and 70 per cent of their radios were unserviceable. The defects had to be remedied at sea by the crew of Wasp who received a very bad impression of the British. The Spitfires were repainted dark blue and the 601 Squadron aircraft had a '1' painted on one side of the fuselage roundel with a letter on the other side; the 603 Squadron Spitfires had a '2' and a letter. The pilots were briefed by Wing Commander McLean and by Squadron Leader "Jumbo" Gracie who was to lead the flight to Malta. (Note: Lloyd had sent Gracie, the commander of 126 Squadron, to London to plead for Spitfires in large numbers, rather than in small instalments and he was the first to take off.) The voyage towards the Mediterranean was quiet, no U-boats being encountered.

=== 17–19 April 1942 ===
On 17 April the screen was exchanged for the destroyers to refuel in Gibraltar, with HMS Antelope, Vidette, Westcott, Wishart and Wrestler. The escort was reinforced by the cruisers Cairo and HMS Charybdis on 19 April. Force W steered away from Cape Spartel during 18/19 April, passing Europa Point at 2:00 a.m. on 19 April, to evade Spanish and Axis observers. Four Spitfire groups were to be formed, led by Gracie, the squadron commanders and the senior flight commander; the Spitfires would fly in pairs or solo. Four Italian submarines lay in ambush but only Velella managed to attack, with no result. VF-71 flew standing patrols over Force W but no Axis aircraft appeared. The weather was good, the sea calm and at 5:18 a.m. on 20 April at 37° 30'N, 03° 20'E. about 50 nmi (93 km; 58 mi) north of Algiers, the 47 airworthy Spitfires began to take off. An RAF mechanic was killed when he backed into the propeller of the Spitfire of Sergeant Fernando Farfan, seen by several pilots as they were waiting to take off; Farfan still had to take off; all but one Spitfire reached Malta. Force W reversed course with VF-71 overhead and heard at 11:17 a.m. that the Spitfires had arrived. The destroyer screen was exchanged; Force W passed through the Strait of Gibraltar on the night of 20/21 April, embarking 812 Naval Air Squadron from Gibraltar for passage to Britain, returning to the Clyde on 26 April.

=== 20 April ===
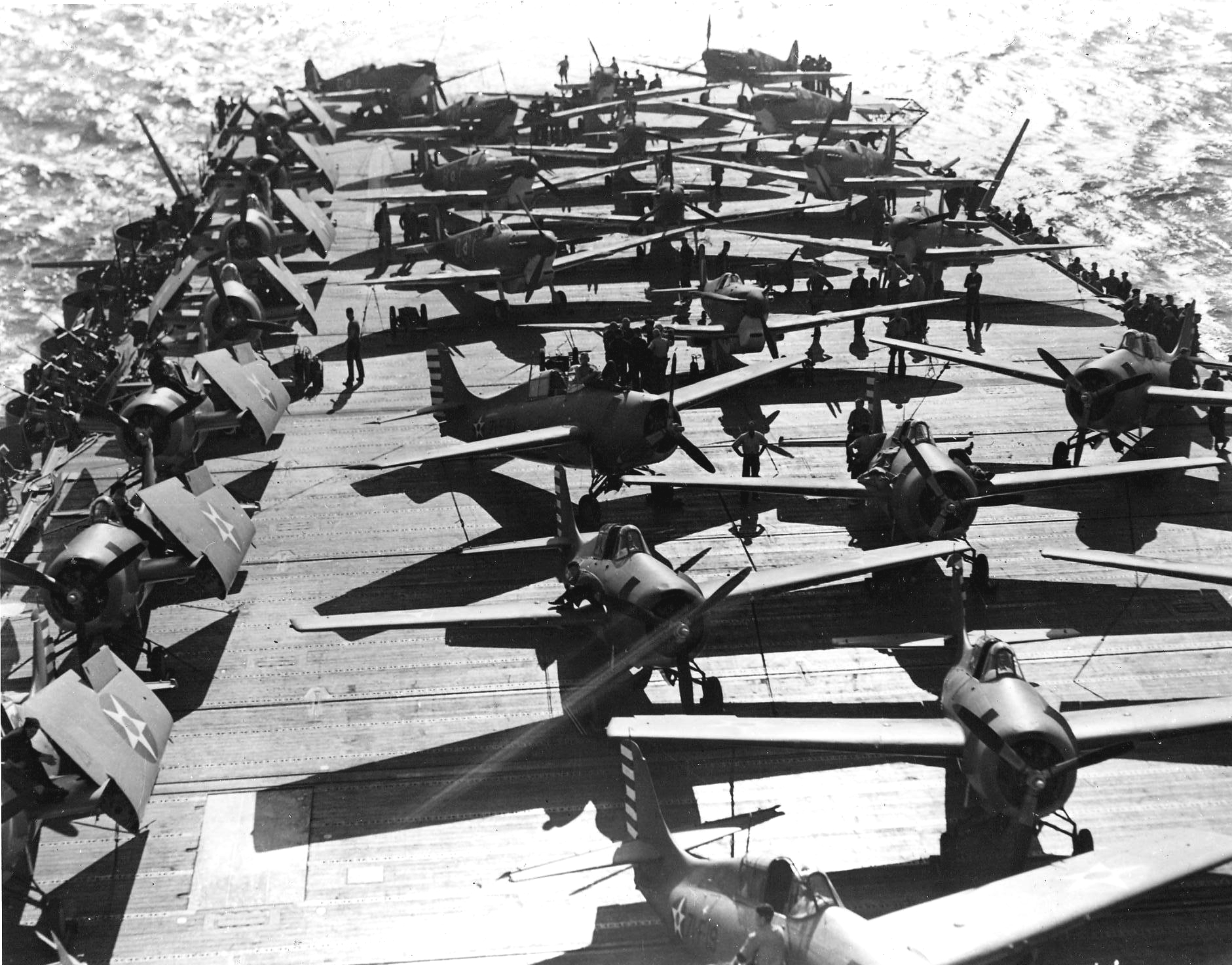
F-4 Wildcats and Spitfires on USS Wasp (CV-7) in April 1942

The flight to Malta began at 4:00 a.m. inside the 580 mi (930 km) radius from Malta considered the maximum for Spitfires with external fuel tanks. Wasp sailed at 28 kn (52 km/h; 32 mph) into an 11–16 kn (20–30 km/h; 13–18 mph) wind from the south-west. The Wildcats had been prepared on the flight deck and the Spitfires warmed up in the hangar deck, because their lack of folding wings precluded them from assembling on the flight deck. Eleven of the F4F-3 Wildcats from VF-71 took off to cover the Spitfires and as soon as they were airborne, the 48 Spitfires, of the 52 fit to fly, were raised in eight seconds each on the lift to the flight deck. Each pilot saw the take-off flag already flying and took off, all the Spitfires being in the air by 5:01 a.m. (Note: Sergeant Salvador "Bud" Walcott, of 603 Squadron, was said to have told Sergeant Dick Buckley that he was not going to try to fly to Malta and once airborne turned for Algeria, about 55 nmi (102 km; 63 mi) to the south. Walcott made a forced landing south of the Atlas Mountains at Setif where he was taken prisoner by Vichy French troops. Walcott later told RAF interrogators that he did this due to enemy aircraft. On transfer to the USAAF in December to join the 346th Fighter Squadron, 350th Fighter Group he said that after taking off he could not retract the undercarriage and fearful of the engine overheating, headed for Algeria. Walcott was imprisoned at Sidi Bel Abbès at the British Internees Camp Laghouat from whence, he and another RAF pilot tried to escape in June, being released after Operation Torch and repatriated to Britain on 24 November 1942; he was on the 346th FS for a year.)

Forty-seven Spitfires arrived safely, 601 Squadron landing at Luqa and 603 Squadron, less one, landing at Takali but the Axis air forces were forewarned of their arrival. The Spitfire pilots found that the blast pens on the Malta airfields were so badly damaged that they gave scant protection from attack. The Germans and Italians knew about the operation and began the first of 300 sorties flown during the day. The Spitfires that survived the first attacks were hard to keep serviceable because of the chronic lack of spares and the lack of experience on Spitfires by the ground crews. The lack of maintenance at Malta exacerbated the mediocre condition of the aircraft sent by the Air Ministry.

=== 21–27 April ===
The flight to Malta was detected by the Germans and Italians on radar and through wireless intercepts and plans were laid to fight the Spitfires on the ground, rather than in the air. Some Bf109s were patrolling over Malta when the Spitfires arrived but none of them were shot down. for the rest of the day the Luftwaffe flew 272 bomber sorties, beginning at 12:30 a.m. when 32 Ju 88s and 20 Ju 87 Stukas attacked the three airfields at Takali, Luqa and Hal Far. A new Spitfire was severely damaged, three more and a Hurricane suffering slight damage. Six new Spitfires from 249 Squadron were scrambled and attacked the German fighter escorts, then tried to land, covered by Hurricanes. At 2:00 p.m. 19 Italian Macchi C.202 Folgore fighters conducted a fighter sweep but two collided and crashed. At 5:15 p.m. about 64 Ju 88s, 25 Ju 87s and at least 30 Bf 109s attacked and six 249 Squadron and six 126 Squadron Spitfires were sent against the formation. The Ju 88s destroyed two Spitfires on the ground at Takali and damaged three more. Two of the 126 Squadron Spitfires were shot down and the pilots killed. Four pilots of 603 Squadron were transferred to 249 Squadron and a pilot was sent from 185 Squadron and 126 Squadron got several of the new arrivals from 601 Squadron. Several pilots were judged too inexperienced and went back to Britain.

The RAF staff at Malta had intended to use half of the reinforcements to replace losses in 126 Squadron and 249 Squadron but losses precluded this. At dawn on 21 April, only 27 Spitfires remained serviceable when the first raid was detected at 7:30 a.m. About 37 Ju 88s with 34 Bf 109 escorts attacked Takali, Luqa, the docks and Grand Harbour. Ten Spitfires and five Hurricanes took off at 8:30 a.m. At 12:10 p.m. 20 Ju 88s, 15 Ju 87s and 36 Bf 109 escorts attacked and destroyed two Spitfires on the ground and damaged one. The final raid occurred at 3:59 p.m. when about 60 Ju 88s, 20 Ju 87s and 40 Bf 109s attacked, destroying two Spitfires at Takali and damaging four; at Luqa seven Wellington bombers were destroyed. By 9:30 a.m. on 22 April only 17 Spitfires were operational. Four Spitfires took off against the raid and a Spitfire was destroyed on the ground at Takali. Seven more Spitfires took off. Another raid at noon was not intercepted but one at 5:20 p.m. with 50 Ju 88s and 20 Ju 87s were opposed by six Spitfires and two Hurricanes. A raid during the evening at Takali was not opposed and three Spitfires were destroyed on the ground. By 27 April two raids were not opposed for lack of fighters. The situation brought Lloyd to despair, the Spitfire delivery having been wasted, under the noses of the Americans.

== Aftermath ==
=== Analysis ===
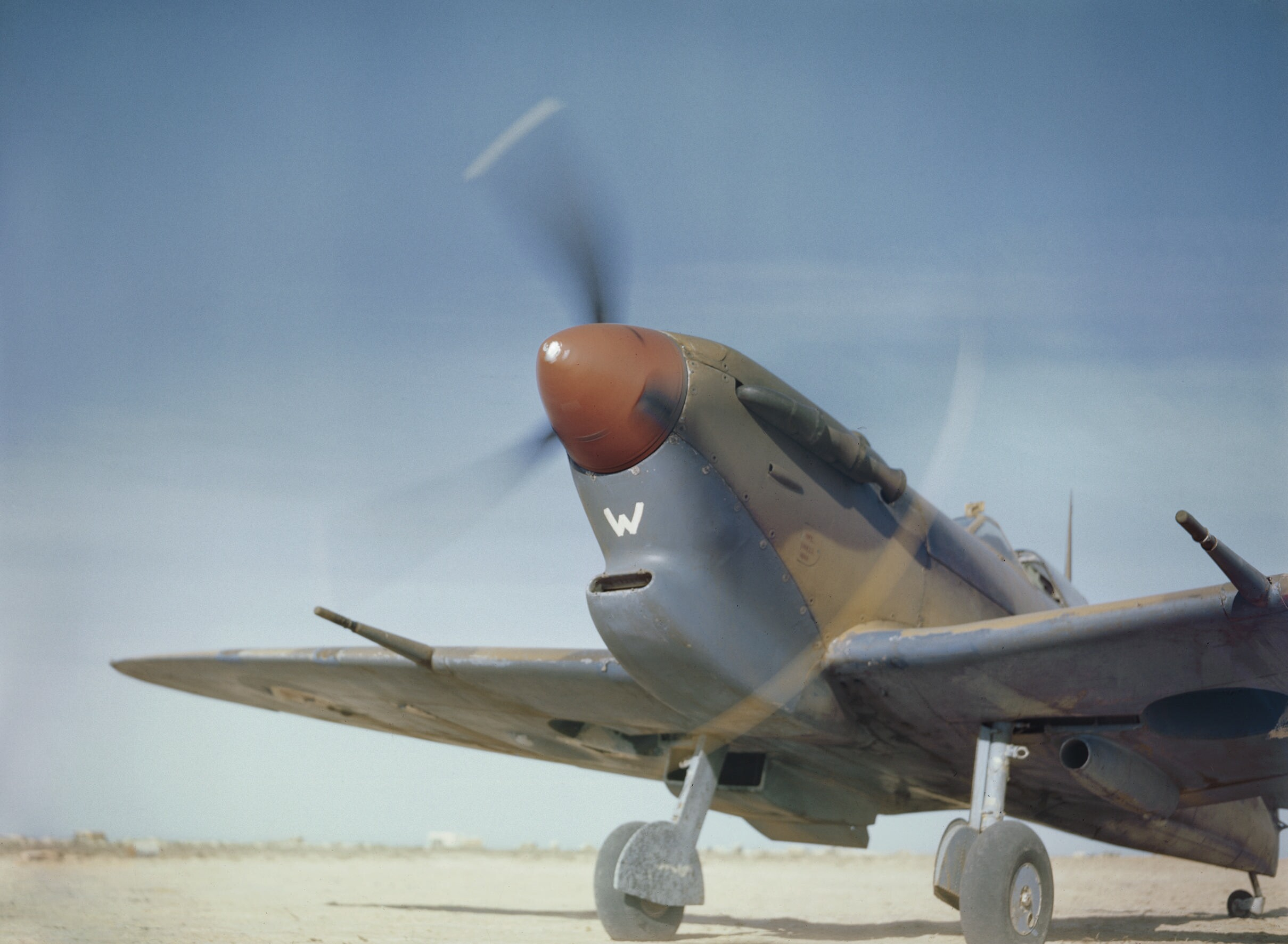
Example of a Spitfire MkV preparing to take off, Malta 1943

Dobbie was reminded of the fiasco of convoy MW 10 and he reported that,

It is obvious that the very worst may happen if we cannot replenish our vital needs, especially flour and ammunition... [It] had become a question of survival.

and that food would run out by mid-June. Churchill took this as a sign that Dobbie was exhausted and needed to be replaced. The failures of MG1 and Calendar were considered to be that the Malta air defence was ineffective and that Dobbie was at fault in asking for a convoy when unable to give it adequate air protection. Dobbie was discreetly removed from his post, said to need a rest but somewhat unfairly blamed for being in an impossible position. Lord Gort flew from Gibraltar and met Dobbie at RAF Kalafrana a seaplane base in the south-east of Malta, during an air raid, late on 7 May then Dobbie flew to Gibraltar in the Sunderland that had brought Gort. The next day, Operation Bowery, another Club Run with Wasp, headed towards Malta.

After the disaster to the Spitfires from Wasp, Gracie reformed the ground organisation for the reception of the next batch of Spitfires and Lloyd managed to get an experienced ground controller from Britain. Spare parts and ground crew experienced on Spitfires were to be rushed to Malta by the fast minelayer HMS Welshman, Churchill told the Admiral of the Fleet, Dudley Pound, the First Sea Lord that,

We may well lose this ship but in view of the emergency...there appears to be no alternative.

==== Operation Bowery ====
Having returned to Glasgow on 29 April 1942, Wasp embarked another 47 Spitfires Mk Vc (trop) at Shieldhall; the aircraft had better streamlining which yielded a small but useful improvement in performance, despite the drag of a tropical air filter. The loading arrangements were as incompetent as they were for Operation Calendar, the condition of the aircraft was just as deplorable and its recurrence was a serious embarrassment. The Flag Officer Glasgow reported that the situation "is unsatisfactory, and has unfortunately created a very bad impression". The long-range fuel tanks still fitted badly and leaked; many aircraft had defective R/T and poorly serviced guns. Reeves refused to continue loading until the long-range tanks had been repaired. Wasp stopped at the Tail of the Bank and its crew completed the repairs to the long-range tanks. Wasp and its destroyers Lang and Sterett sailed to Scapa Flow. As Force W, with Renown, the cruiser Charybdis and the destroyers Echo and Intrepid the US ships sailed from Scapa Flow on 3 May.

== Orders of battle ==
=== Scotland to Gibraltar ===
Force W
Ship	Flag	Type	Notes
USS Wasp	United States Navy	Yorktown-class aircraft carrier	
HMS Renown	Royal Navy	Renown-class battlecruiser	Commodore Charles Daniel
USS Lang	United States Navy	Benham-class destroyer	
USS Madison	United States Navy	Benson-class destroyer	
HMS Echo	Royal Navy	E-class destroyer	
HMS Inglefield	Royal Navy	I-class destroyer	
HMS Ithuriel	Royal Navy	I-class destroyer	
HMS Partridge	Royal Navy	P-class destroyer	

=== Gibraltar towards Malta ===
Force W
Ship	Flag	Type	Notes
USS Wasp	United States Navy	Yorktown-class aircraft carrier	
HMS Renown	Royal Navy	Renown-class battlecruiser	
HMS Cairo	Royal Navy	C-class cruiser	
HMS Charybdis	Royal Navy	Dido-class cruiser	
HMS Antelope	Royal Navy	A-class destroyer	
HMS Vidette	Royal Navy	V-class destroyer	
HMS Westcott	Royal Navy	W-class destroyer	
HMS Wishart	Royal Navy	W-class destroyer	
HMS Wrestler	Royal Navy	W-class destroyer	
