= USS Wasp (CV-7) =

Aircraft carrier of the US Navy

Coordinates: 12°24′58″S 164°8′0″E

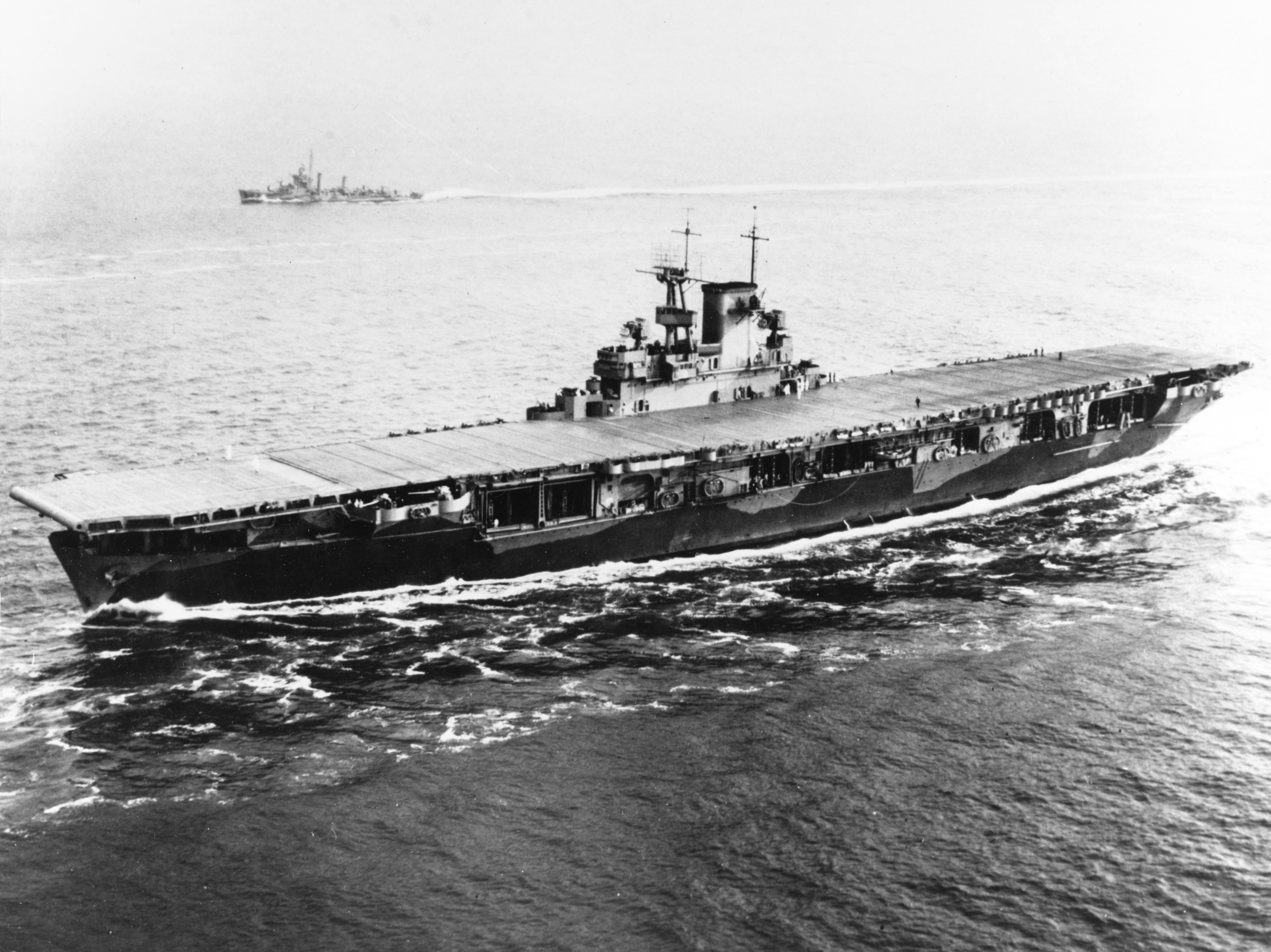
- Wasp entering Hampton Roads

Class overview
- Name: Wasp class
- Operators: United States Navy
- Preceded by: Yorktown class
- Succeeded by: Essex class
- Built: 1936–1940
- In commission: 1940–1942
- Planned: 1
- Completed: 1
- Lost: 1

History

United States
- Name: Wasp
- Namesake: Wasp
- Ordered: 19 September 1935
- Builder: Fore River Shipyard
- Laid down: 1 April 1936
- Launched: 4 April 1939
- Sponsored by: Mrs. Charles Edison
- Commissioned: 25 April 1940
- Stricken: 15 September 1942
- Honors and awards: American Defense Service Medal ("A" device) / American Campaign Medal/European-African-Middle Eastern Campaign Medal (1 star) / Asiatic-Pacific Campaign Medal (1 star) / World War II Victory Medal
- Fate: Scuttled after attack by the Japanese submarine I-19, 15 September 1942 (Note: The battleship North Carolina and destroyer O'Brien were also hit by torpedoes during the same attack. O'Brien later sank as a result of the torpedo damage, and North Carolina was under repair at Pearl Harbor until 16 November 1942.)

General characteristics (as built)
- Type: Aircraft carrier
- Displacement: 14,700 long tons (14,900 t) (standard); 19,116 long tons (19,423 t) (full load)
- Length: 688 ft (209.7 m) (waterline); 741 ft 3 in (225.9 m) (overall); 727 ft (222 m) (flight deck)
- Beam: 80 ft 9 in (24.6 m) (waterline); 109 ft (33.2 m) (overall)
- Draft: 20 ft (6.1 m)
- Installed power: 70,000 shp (52,000 kW); 6 × water-tube boilers
- Propulsion: 2 × shafts; 2 × steam turbines
- Speed: 29.5 knots (54.6 km/h; 33.9 mph)
- Range: 12,000 nmi (22,000 km; 14,000 mi) at 15 knots (28 km/h; 17 mph)
- Complement: 1,800 officers and men (peacetime); 2,167 (wartime)
- Sensors & processing systems: CXAM-1 radar
- Armament: 8 × 5 in (127 mm) guns; 16 × 1.1 in (28 mm) AA guns; 24 × 0.50 in (12.7 mm) machine guns
- Armor: 1.5 in (38 mm) conning tower; 3.5 in (89 mm) side and 1.25 in (32 mm) deck over steering gear
- Aircraft carried: Up to 100
- Aviation facilities: 3 × elevators; 4 × hydraulic catapults (2 flight deck, 2 hangar deck)

USS Wasp (CV-7) was a United States Navy aircraft carrier commissioned in 1940 and lost in action in 1942. She was the eighth ship named USS Wasp, and the sole ship of a class built to use up the remaining tonnage allowed to the U.S. for aircraft carriers under the treaties of the time. As a reduced-size version of the Yorktown-class aircraft carrier hull, Wasp was more vulnerable than other United States aircraft carriers available at the opening of hostilities. Wasp was initially employed in the Atlantic campaign, where Axis naval forces were perceived as less capable of inflicting decisive damage. After supporting the occupation of Iceland in 1941, Wasp joined the British Home Fleet in April 1942 and twice ferried British fighter aircraft to Malta.

Wasp was then transferred to the Pacific in June 1942 to replace losses at the battles of Coral Sea and Midway. After supporting the invasion of Guadalcanal, Wasp was hit by two or three torpedoes from Japanese submarine I-19 on 15 September 1942. The resulting damage set off several explosions, destroyed her water-mains and knocked out the ship's power. As a result, her damage-control teams were unable to contain the ensuing fires that blazed out of control. Of the 2,139 people aboard, 193 were killed and 366 injured; 46 of her 71 aircraft were lost. She was abandoned and scuttled by torpedoes fired from USS Lansdowne later that evening. Her wreck was found in early 2019.

== Design ==
Wasp was a product of the Washington Naval Treaty. After the construction of the carriers Yorktown and Enterprise, the U.S. was still permitted 15,000 long tons (15,000 t) to build a carrier.

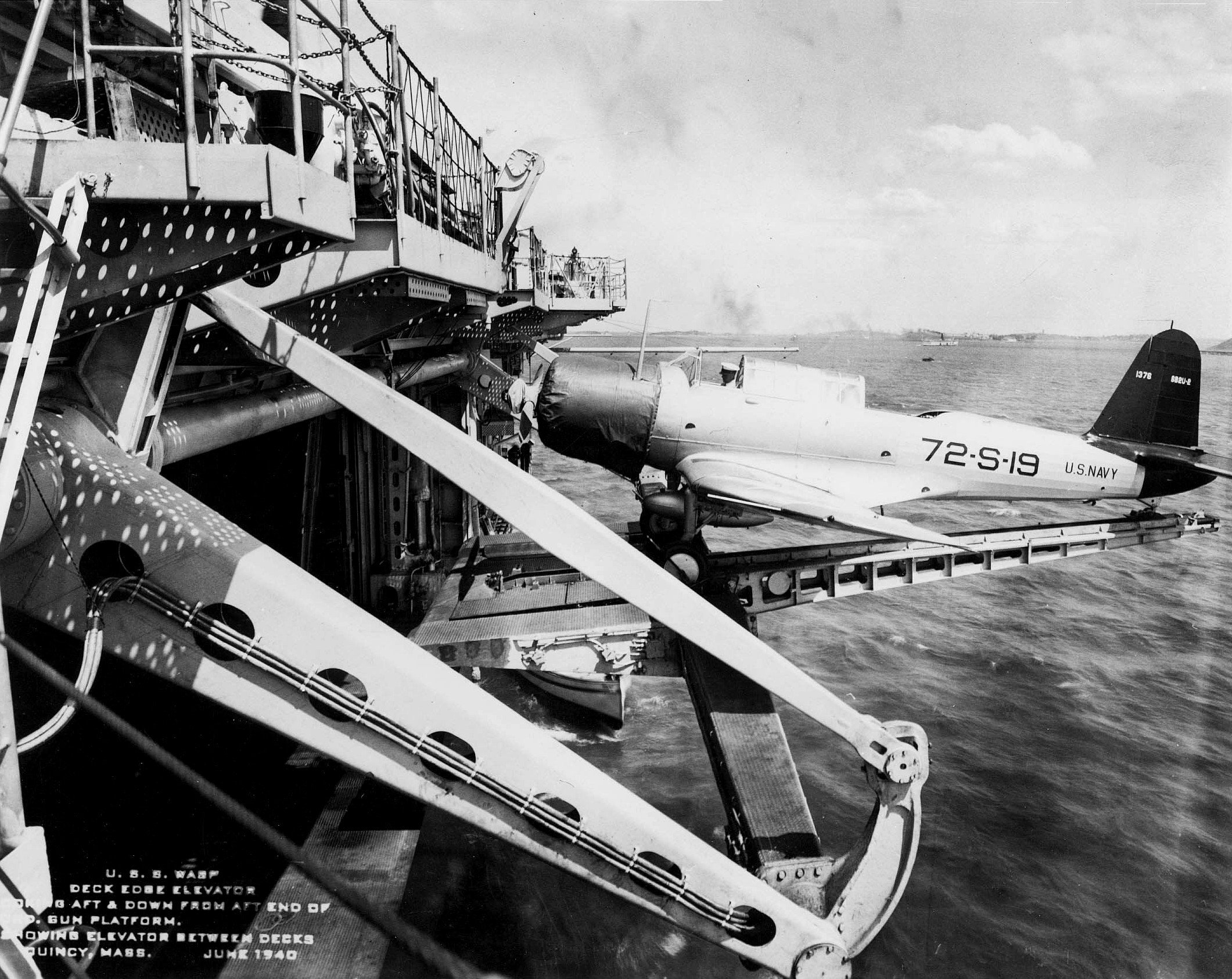
Wasp was the first carrier fitted with a deck-edge elevator.

The Navy sought to squeeze a large air group onto a ship with nearly 25% less displacement than the Yorktown-class. To save weight and space, Wasp was constructed with low-power propulsion machinery (compare Wasp's 75,000 shp (56,000 kW) machinery with Yorktown's 120,000 shp (89,000 kW), the Essex-class's 150,000 shp (110,000 kW), and the Independence-class's 100,000 shp (75,000 kW)).

Additionally, Wasp was launched with almost no armor, modest speed, and more significantly, no protection from torpedoes. Absence of side protection of the boilers and internal aviation fuel stores "doomed her to a blazing demise". These were inherent design flaws that were recognized when constructed, but could not be remedied within the allowed tonnage. These flaws, combined with a relative lack of damage control experience in the early days of the war, proved fatal.

Wasp was the first carrier fitted with a deck-edge elevator for aircraft. The elevator consisted of a platform for the front wheels of the plane and an outrigger for the tail wheel. The two arms on the sides moved the platform in a half-circle up and down between the flight deck and the hangar deck.

== Construction and commissioning ==
Her keel was laid down on 1 April 1936 at the Fore River Shipyard in Quincy, Massachusetts; launched on 4 April 1939, sponsored by Carolyn Edison (wife of Assistant Secretary of the Navy Charles Edison), and commissioned on 25 April 1940 at the Army Quartermaster Base, South Boston, Massachusetts, with Captain John W. Reeves, Jr. in command.

== Service history ==
Wasp remained at Boston through May, fitting out, before she got underway on 5 June 1940 for calibration tests on her radio direction finder gear. After further fitting out while anchored in Boston harbor, the new aircraft carrier steamed independently to Hampton Roads, Virginia, anchoring there on 24 June. Four days later, she sailed for the Caribbean in company with the destroyer Morris.

En route, she conducted the first of many carrier qualification tests. Among the earliest of the qualifiers was Lieutenant, junior grade David McCampbell, who later became the Navy's top-scoring ace in World War II. Wasp arrived at Guantanamo Bay Naval Base in time to "dress ship" in honor of Independence Day.

During shakedown on 9 July, one of her Vought SB2U-2 Vindicator dive bombers crashed 2 nautical miles (2.3 mi; 3.7 km) from the ship killing the two crew.

Wasp returned to Hampton Roads 15 July, embarking aircraft from the 1st Marine Air Group for qualification trials at sea, and then returning a week later. The Marines and their planes were disembarked at Norfolk, and the carrier moved to Boston for post shakedown repairs.

She fired a 21-gun salute in honor of President Franklin Delano Roosevelt, whose yacht, Potomac, stopped briefly at the Boston Navy Yard on 10 August.

Wasp departed the Army Quartermaster Base on 21 August to conduct steering drills and full-power trials. Late the following morning, she got underway for Norfolk, Virginia. For the next few days, while destroyer Ellis operated as plane guard, Wasp launched and recovered her aircraft: fighters from Fighter Squadron 7 (VF-7), and scout bombers from Scouting Squadron 72 (VS-72). The carrier put into the Norfolk Navy Yard on 28 August for repair work on her turbines and Wasp was drydocked from 12 to 18 September.

Wasp ran her final sea trials in Hampton Roads on 26 September 1940. Assigned to Carrier Division 3, Patrol Force, Wasp shifted to Naval Operating Base, Norfolk on 11 October. There, she loaded 24 Curtiss P-40 fighters from the Army Air Corps' 8th Pursuit Group and nine North American O-47A reconnaissance aircraft from the 2d Observation Squadron, as well as her own spares and utility unit Grumman J2F Duck amphibian on the 12th. Wasp subsequently flew off the Army planes in a test designed to compare the take-off runs of standard Navy and Army aircraft. This was the first time that Army planes had flown from a Navy carrier and foreshadowed the use of the ship in the ferry role in World War II.

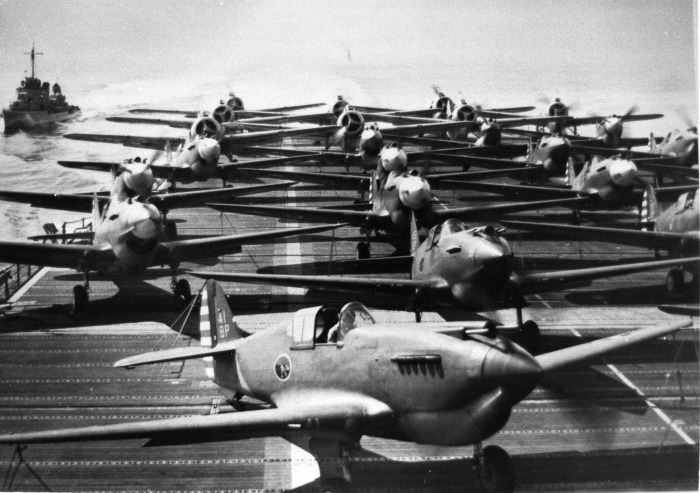
P-40Bs aboard Wasp in October 1940

Wasp then proceeded on toward Cuba in company with the destroyers Plunkett and Niblack. Over the ensuing four days, the carrier's planes flew routine training flights, including dive-bombing and machine-gun practices.

For the remainder of October and into November, Wasp trained in the Guantánamo Bay area. Her planes flew carrier qualification and refresher training flights, while her gunners sharpened up their skills in short-range battle practices at targets towed by the new fleet tug Seminole.

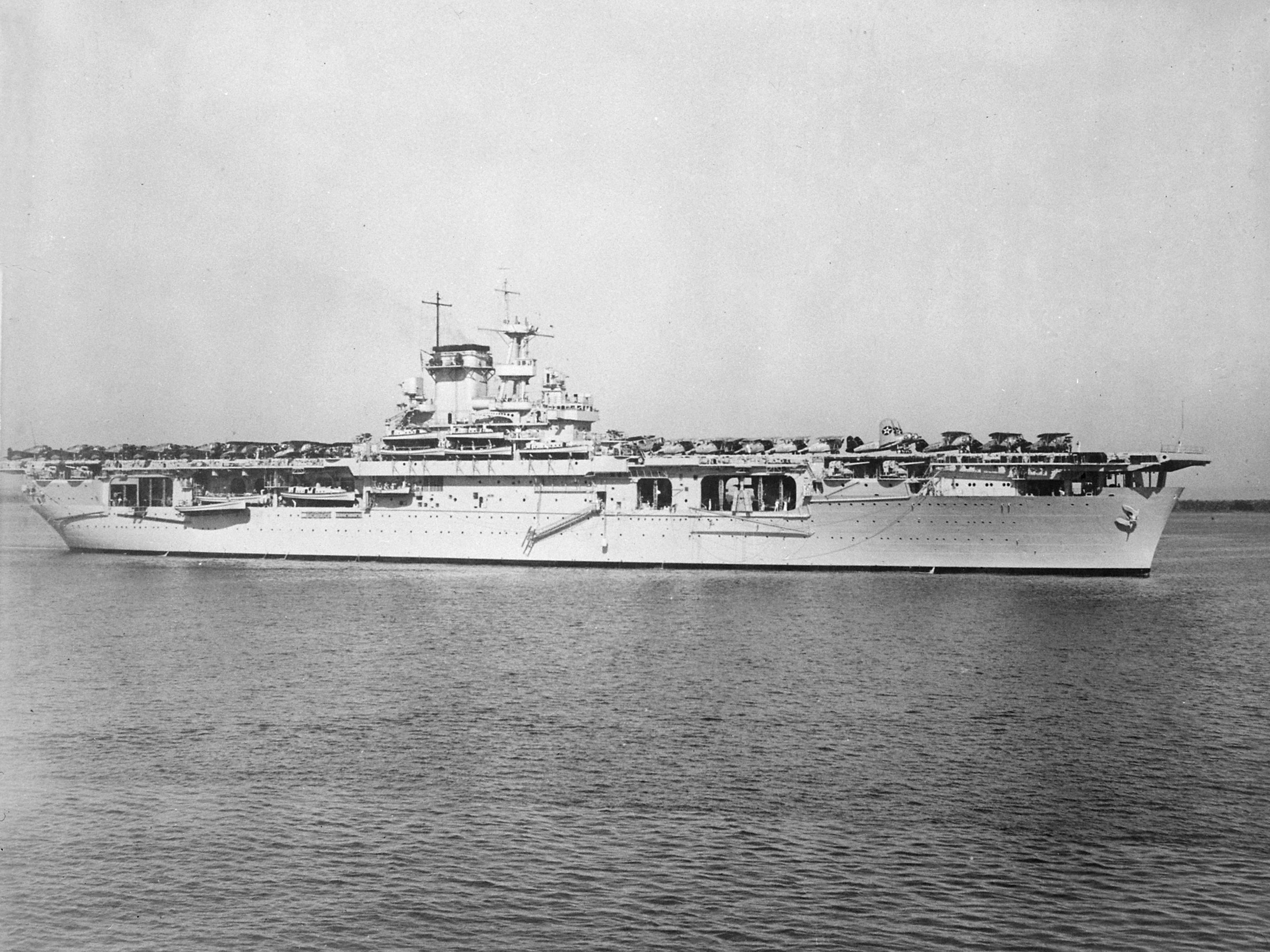
Wasp on 27 December 1940

Wasp sailed for Norfolk and arrived shortly after noon on 26 November. remaining at the Norfolk Navy Yard through Christmas of 1940. Then, after first conducting degaussing experiments with the survey ship Hannibal, she steamed independently to Cuba.

Arriving at Guantánamo Bay on 27 January 1941, Wasp conducted a regular routine of flight operations into February. With destroyer Walke as her plane guard, Wasp operated out of Guantanamo and Culebra, conducting her maneuvers with an array of warships— the WWI-era battleship Texas, carrier Ranger, heavy cruisers Tuscaloosa, Wichita, and destroyers. Wasp ran gunnery drills and exercises, as well as routine flight training evolutions into March. Underway for Hampton Roads on 4 March, the aircraft carrier conducted a night battle practice into the early morning hours of the 5th.

During the passage to Norfolk, heavy weather sprang up on the evening of 7 March. Wasp was steaming at standard speed, 17 knots (20 mph; 31 km/h). Off Cape Hatteras, a lookout spotted a red flare at 22:45, then a second set of flares at 22:59. At 23:29, with the aid of her searchlights, Wasp located the stranger in trouble. She was the lumber schooner George E. Klinck, bound from Jacksonville, Florida, to Southwest Harbor, Maine.

The sea, in the meantime, worsened from a state 5 to a state 7. Wasp lay to, maneuvering alongside at 00:07 on 8 March. At that time, four men from the schooner clambered up a swaying Jacob's ladder buffeted by gusts of wind. Then, despite the raging tempest, Wasp lowered a boat, at 00:16, and brought the remaining four men aboard from the foundering 152 ft (46 m) schooner.

Later that day, Wasp disembarked her rescued mariners and immediately went into drydock at the Norfolk Navy Yard. The ship received vital repairs to her turbines. Portholes on the third deck were welded over to provide better watertight integrity, and steel splinter shielding around her 5 in (130 mm) and 1.1 in (28 mm) batteries was added. Wasp was one of 14 ships to receive the early RCA CXAM-1 radar. After those repairs and alterations were finished, Wasp got underway for the Virgin Islands on 22 March, arriving at St. Thomas three days later. She soon shifted to Guantánamo Bay and loaded maritime supplies for transportation to Norfolk.

Returning to Norfolk on 30 March, Wasp conducted routine flight operations out of Hampton Roads over the ensuing days, into April. In company with Sampson, the carrier conducted an abortive search for a downed patrol plane in her vicinity on 8 April. For the remainder of the month, Wasp operated off the East Coast of the United States between Newport, Rhode Island, and Norfolk, conducting extensive flight and patrol operations with her embarked air group. She shifted to Bermuda in mid-May, anchoring at Grassy Bay, Bermuda on the 12th. Eight days later, the ship got underway in company with the heavy cruiser Quincy and the destroyers Livermore and Kearny for exercises at sea before returning to Grassy Bay on 3 June. Wasp sailed for Norfolk three days later with the destroyer Edison as her anti-submarine screen.

After a brief stay in the Tidewater area, Wasp headed back toward Bermuda on 20 June. Wasp and her escorts patrolled the stretch of the Atlantic between Bermuda and Hampton Roads until 5 July, as the Atlantic Fleet's neutrality patrol zones were extended eastward. Reaching Grassy Bay on that day, she remained in port a week before returning to Norfolk, sailing on 12 July in company with heavy cruiser Tuscaloosa and destroyers Grayson, Anderson, and Rowan.

=== Occupation of Iceland ===
Following her return to Norfolk on 13 July 1941, Wasp and her embarked air group conducted refresher training off the Virginia Capes. Meanwhile, the situation in the Atlantic had taken on a new complexion, with American participation in the Battle of the Atlantic only a matter of time, when the United States took another step toward involvement on the side of the British. To protect American security and to free British forces needed elsewhere, the United States made plans to take over the occupation of Iceland relieving Canadian forces there. On 23-24 July, 32 Army Air Forces pilots and 30 P-40Cs and three PT-17 trainers from the AAF 33rd Pursuit Squadron, were taken aboard. Four newspaper correspondents – including the noted journalist Fletcher Pratt — came on board.

The carrier had drawn the assignment of ferrying those vital army planes to Iceland because of a lack of British aircraft to cover the American landings. The American P-40s would provide the defensive fighter cover necessary to watch over the initial American occupying forces. Wasp slipped out to sea on 28 July, with the destroyers O'Brien and Walke as plane guards. The heavy cruiser Vincennes later joined the formation at sea.

Within a few days, Wasp's group joined the larger Task Force 16—consisting of the battleship Mississippi, the heavy cruisers Quincy and Wichita, five destroyers, the auxiliary Semmes, the attack transport American Legion, the stores ship Mizar, and the amphibious cargo ship Almaack. Those ships, too, were bound for Iceland with the first occupation troops embarked. On the morning of 6 August, Wasp, Vincennes, Walke, and O'Brien parted company from Task Force 16 (TF 16). Soon thereafter, the carrier turned into the wind and commenced launching the planes from the 33rd Pursuit Squadron. As the P-40s and the trio of trainers droned on to Iceland, Wasp headed home for Norfolk, her three escorts in company. After another week at sea, the group arrived back at Norfolk on 14 August.

=== Neutrality patrols ===
Wasp put to sea again on 22 August for carrier qualifications and refresher landings off the Virginia capes. Two days later, Rear Admiral H. Kent Hewitt, Commander Cruisers, Atlantic Fleet, shifted his flag from the light cruiser Savannah to Wasp while the ships lay anchored in Hampton Roads. Underway on the 25th, in company with Savannah and the destroyers Monssen and Kearny, the aircraft carrier conducted flight operations over the ensuing days. Scuttlebutt on board the carrier had her steaming out in search of the German heavy cruiser Admiral Hipper, which was reportedly roaming the western Atlantic in search of prey. Suspicions were confirmed for many on the 30th when the British battleship HMS Rodney was sighted some 20 nautical miles (37 km; 23 mi) away, on the same course as the Americans.

In any event, if they had been in search of a German raider, they did not make contact with her. Wasp and her escorts anchored in the Gulf of Paria, Trinidad, on 2 September, where Admiral Hewitt shifted his flag back to Savannah. The carrier remained in port until 6 September, when she again put to sea on patrol "to enforce the neutrality of the United States in the Atlantic".

While at sea, the ship received the news of a German U-boat unsuccessfully attempting to attack the destroyer Greer. The U.S. had been getting more and more involved in the war; American warships were now convoying British merchantmen halfway across the Atlantic to the "mid-ocean meeting point" (MOMP).

Wasp's crew looked forward to returning to Bermuda on 18 September, but the new situation in the Atlantic meant a change in plans. Shifted to the colder climes of Newfoundland, the carrier arrived at Placentia Bay on 22 September and fueled from the oiler Salinas the following day. The respite in port was a brief one, however, as the ship got underway again, late on 23 September for Iceland. In company with Wichita, four destroyers, and the repair ship Vulcan, Wasp arrived at Hvalfjörður, Iceland, on 28 September. Two days earlier, Admiral Harold R. Stark, the Chief of Naval Operations had ordered American warships to do their utmost to destroy whatever German or Italian warships they found.

With the accelerated activity entailed in the US Navy's conducting convoy escort missions, Wasp put to sea on 6 October in company with Vincennes and four destroyers. Those ships patrolled the foggy, cold North Atlantic until returning to Little Placentia Bay, Newfoundland on 11 October, anchoring during a fierce gale that lashed the bay with high winds and stinging spray. On 17 October, Wasp set out for Norfolk, patrolling en route, and arrived at her destination on 20 October. The carrier soon sailed for Bermuda and conducted qualifications and refresher training flights en route. Anchoring in Grassy Bay on 1 November, Wasp operated on patrols out of Bermuda for the remainder of the month.

October had seen the incidents involving American and German warships multiplying on the high seas. Kearny was torpedoed on 17 October, Salinas on 28 October, and in the most tragic incident that autumn, Reuben James was torpedoed and sunk with heavy loss of life on 30 October. Meanwhile, in the Pacific, tension between the U.S. and Japan increased almost with each passing day.

Wasp slipped out to sea from Grassy Bay on 3 December and rendezvoused with Wilson. While the destroyer operated as plane guard, Wasp's air group flew day and night refresher training missions. In addition, the two ships conducted gunnery drills before returning to Grassy Bay two days later, where she lay at anchor on 7 December 1941 during the Japanese attack on Pearl Harbor.

=== Atlantic Fleet ===
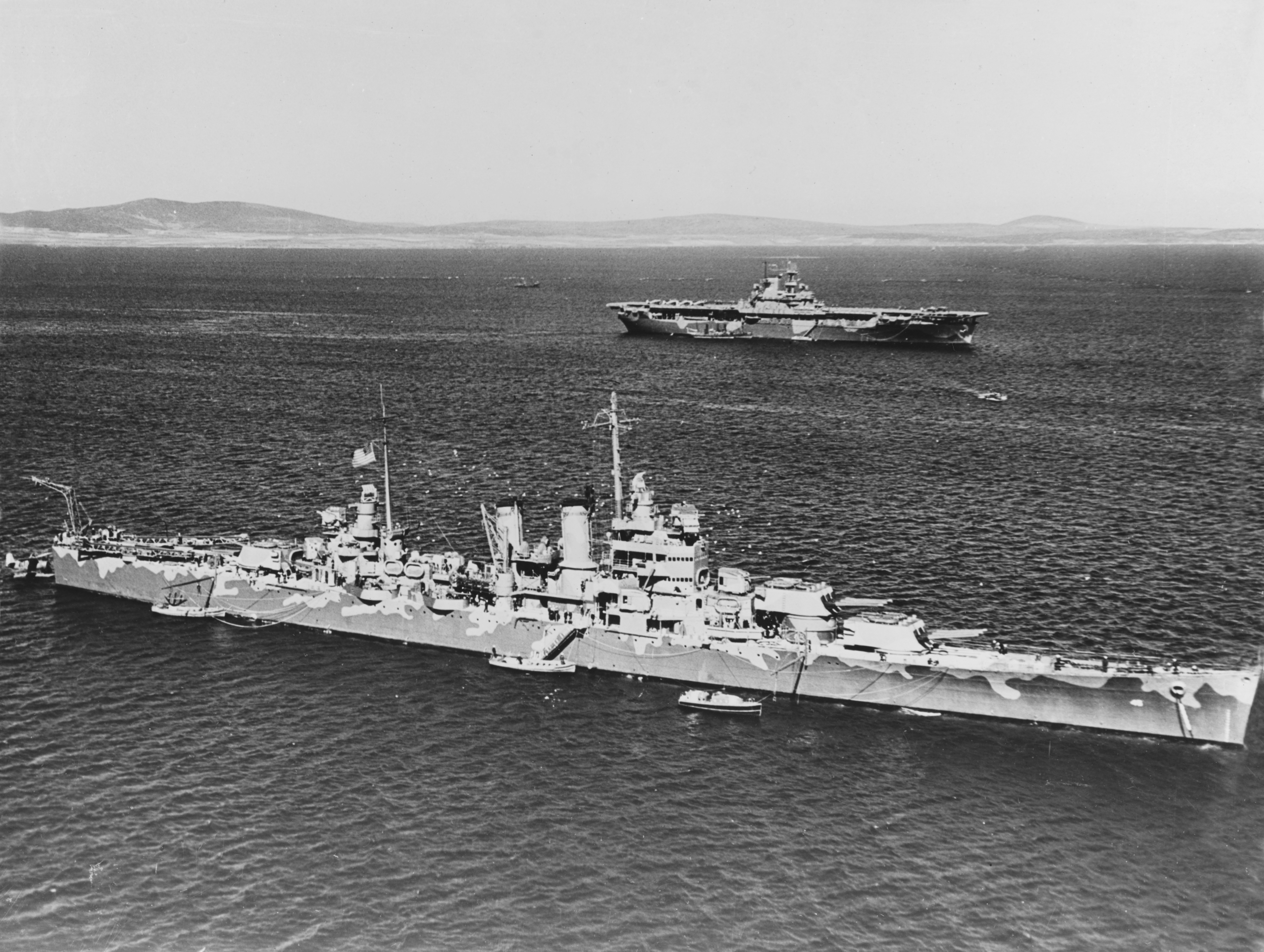
Wasp and the heavy cruiser Wichita in Scapa Flow.

Naval authorities felt considerable anxiety that French warships in the Caribbean and West Indies were prepared to make a breakout and attempt to get back to France. Accordingly, Wasp, the light cruiser Brooklyn, and the destroyers Sterett and Wilson, departed Grassy Bay and headed for Martinique. Faulty intelligence gave American authorities in Washington the impression that the Vichy French armed merchant cruiser Barfleur had gotten underway for sea. The French were accordingly warned that the auxiliary cruiser would be sunk or captured unless she returned to port and resumed her internment. As it turned out, Barfleur had not departed after all, but had remained in harbor. The tense situation at Martinique eventually dissipated, and the crisis abated.

With tensions in the West Indies lessened considerably, Wasp departed Grassy Bay and headed for Hampton Roads in company with Long Island, and escorted by the destroyers Stack and Sterett. and moored at the Norfolk Navy Yard to commence an overhaul that would last into the start of 1942.

After departing Norfolk on 14 January 1942, Wasp headed north and touched at NS Argentia, Newfoundland, and Casco Bay, Maine. On 16 March, as part of Task Group 22.6 (TG 22.6), she headed back toward Norfolk. During the morning watch the next day, visibility lessened considerably; and, at 06:50, Wasp's bow plunged into Stack's starboard side, punching a hole and completely flooding the destroyer's number one fireroom. Stack was detached and proceeded to the Philadelphia Navy Yard, where her damage was repaired.

Meanwhile, Wasp made port at Norfolk on the 21st without further incident. Shifting back to Casco Bay three days later, she sailed for the British Isles on 26 March 1942 with Task Force 39 under the command of Rear Admiral John W. Wilcox, Jr., aboard the battleship Washington. That force was to reinforce the Home Fleet of the Royal Navy. While en route, Rear Admiral Wilcox was swept overboard from the battleship on the morning of 27 March 1942 and drowned. Although hampered by poor visibility conditions, four SB2U Vindicators from Wasp took part in the search, and one of them crashed while attempting to land aboard Wasp, killing its two-man crew. Wilcox's body was spotted an hour after he went overboard, face down in the raging seas, but it was not recovered due to the weather and the heavy seas.

Rear Admiral Robert C. Giffen, who flew his flag in the heavy cruiser Wichita, assumed command of TF 39. The American ships were met by a force based around the light cruiser HMS Edinburgh on 3 April. Those ships escorted them to Scapa Flow in the Orkney Islands.

The majority of TF 39 joined the British Home Fleet – renumbered to TF 99 in the process – to cover convoys routed to North Russia, Wasp departed Scapa Flow on 9 April, bound for the Clyde estuary and Greenock, Scotland. The following day, the carrier sailed up the Clyde, past the John Brown Clydebank shipbuilding facilities. There, shipyard workers paused long enough from their labors to accord Wasp a tumultuous reception as she passed. Wasp's impending mission was an important one – one upon which the fate of the island bastion of Malta hung. During the Siege of Malta it was under daily attack by German and Italian aircraft. The British, faced with the loss of air superiority over the island, and their own carriers unable to continue the Club Runs ferrying replacement aircraft to Malta, requested the use of Wasp to transport planes that could wrest air superiority from the Axis aircraft. Wasp drew ferry duty once again to participate in Operation Calendar, one of many Malta Convoys.

=== Malta Convoys ===
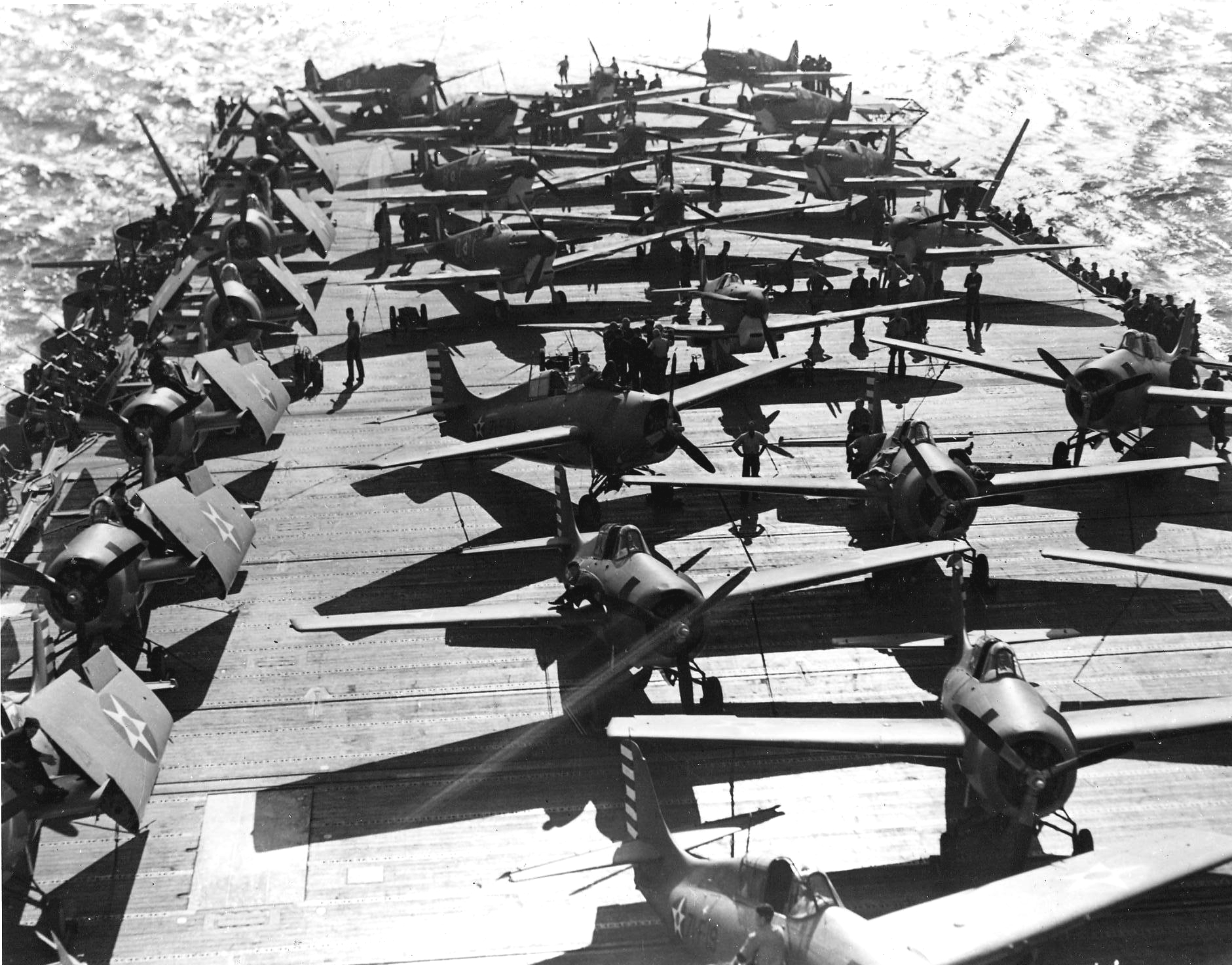
Spitfires and Wildcats aboard Wasp on 19 April 1942.

Having landed her torpedo bombers and dive bombers at RNAS Hatston in Orkney, Wasp loaded 52 Supermarine Spitfire Mk. V fighters (fitted with long range fuel tanks) of No. 601 and No. 603 Squadron RAF at Glasgow on 13 April, then departed on 14 April, this was the start of "Operation Calendar". Her screen consisted of Force W of the Home Fleet – a group that included the battlecruiser HMS Renown and the anti-aircraft cruisers HMS Cairo and Charybdis. Madison and Lang also served in Wasp's screen.

The group passed through the Straits of Gibraltar under cover of the pre-dawn darkness on 19 April, avoiding the possibility of being discovered by Spanish or Axis agents. At 04:00 on 20 April, Wasp spotted 11 Grumman F4F Wildcat fighters on her deck and quickly launched them to form a combat air patrol (CAP) over Force W, while the Spitfires were warming up their engines in the hangar deck spaces below. Once all 47 serviceable Spitfires had launched and were flying to Malta Wasp retired toward Gibraltar. However most of the Spitfires were lost when the Axis attacked Malta within minutes after they landed.

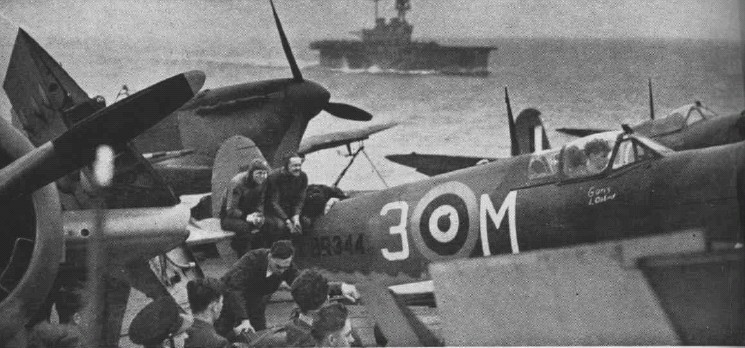
HMS Eagle accompanies Wasp on her second voyage to Malta

As a result, it looked as if a second ferry run to Malta was needed. The British Prime Minister Winston Churchill, fearing that Malta would be "pounded to bits", asked President Roosevelt to allow Wasp to have "another good sting." and Wasp loaded another contingent of Spitfire Vs at King George V Dock Glasgow and sailed for the Mediterranean on 3 May in Operation Bowery. On this occasion, the group included the British carrier HMS Eagle with her own load of Spitfires.

The two carriers reached their launching points early on Saturday, 9 May - Wasp steaming in column ahead of Eagle at a distance of 1,000 yards (910 m). At 06:30, Wasp launched 11 Wildcats of VF-71 to serve as CAP over the task force. First, Eagle flew off her 17 Spitfires in two waves; then Wasp flew off 47 more. The 23rd Spitfire that took off at 06:43, piloted by Sergeant-Pilot Don Sherrington, lost power soon after takeoff and plunged into the sea, with loss of pilot and aircraft. The other planes flew off safely and formed up to fly to Malta.

An auxiliary fuel tank on another aircraft failed to draw; without the additional fuel the pilot could not make Malta, and his only alternatives were to land on board Wasp – with no tailhook – or to ditch and take his chances in the water. Pilot Officer Jerrold Alpine Smith chose to attempt a landing on Wasp, setting down at 07:43 with his Spitfire stopping just 15 feet (4.6 m) from the forward edge of the flight deck. One Wasp sailor observed it to be a "one wire" landing. Wasp set sail for the British Isles while a German radio station broadcast the startling news that the American carrier had been sunk; on 11 May, Prime Minister Churchill sent a message to Wasp: "Many thanks to you all for the timely help. Who said a wasp couldn't sting twice?" The preparations for the reception of the Spitfires at Malta had been improved and within minutes they were airborne again and able to take on German aircraft when they attacked, shooting down 37.

=== Pacific Fleet ===
Early in May 1942, almost simultaneously with Operation Bowery, the Battle of the Coral Sea had been fought, then the Battle of Midway a month later. The loss of Lexington and Yorktown in the battles reduced the U.S. to three carriers in the Pacific, and it became imperative to transfer Wasp to the Pacific. (Note: Following further losses and battle damage to American carriers in the Pacific War in November, the British carrier HMS Victorious was transferred to serve under the USN in 1943)

Wasp hurried back to the U.S. for alterations and repairs at the Norfolk Navy Yard. During the carrier's stay in the Tidewater region, Captain Reeves – who had been promoted to flag rank – was relieved by Captain Forrest P. Sherman on 31 May. Departing Norfolk on 6 June, Wasp sailed with TF 37 which was built around the carrier and the battleship North Carolina and escorted by Quincy, San Juan and six destroyers. The group transited the Panama Canal on 10 June, at which time Wasp and her consorts became TF 18, the carrier flying the flag of Rear Admiral Leigh Noyes.

Arriving at San Diego on 19 June, Wasp embarked the remainder of her complement of aircraft, Grumman TBF-1 Avengers and Douglas SBD-3 Dauntlesses, the latter replacing the old Vindicators. On 1 July, she sailed for the Tonga Islands as part of the convoy for the five transports carrying the 2nd Marine Regiment.

Meanwhile, preparations to invade the Solomon Islands were proceeding to disrupt the Japanese offensive to establish a defensive perimeter around the edge of their "Greater East Asia Co-Prosperity Sphere".

=== Guadalcanal Campaign ===
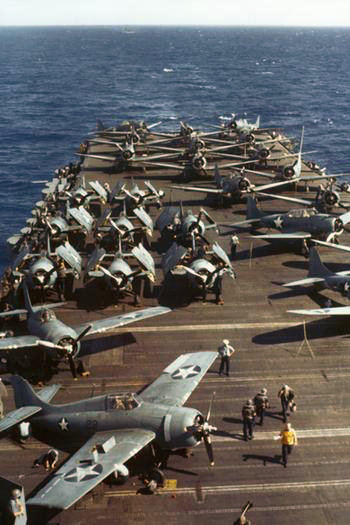
Wasp's flight deck, 1942.

On 4 July, while Wasp was en route to the South Pacific, the Japanese landed on Guadalcanal. Allied planners realized Japanese operation of land-based aircraft from that key island would threaten Allied control of the New Hebrides and New Caledonia area. Plans were made to evict the Japanese before their Guadalcanal airfield became operational. Vice Admiral Robert L. Ghormley – with experience as Special Naval Observer in London – was detailed to take command of the operation; and he established his headquarters at Auckland, New Zealand. Since the Japanese had a foothold on Guadalcanal, time was of the essence; preparations for an Allied invasion proceeded with secrecy and speed.

Wasp – together with the carriers Saratoga and Enterprise – was assigned to the Support Force under Vice Admiral Frank Jack Fletcher. Under the tactical command of Rear Admiral Noyes, embarked on Wasp, the carriers were to provide air support for the invasion and initiation of the Guadalcanal campaign.

Wasp and her airmen practiced day and night operations until Captain Sherman was confident that his airmen could perform their mission. "D-day" had been set for 1 August, but the late arrival of some of the transports carrying Marines pushed the date to 7 August.

En route, Wasp's engines became a problem, reporting to Commander in Chief Pacific on 14 July that her starboard high-pressure turbine even at lowest speeds was making a loud scraping noise. This limited speed to only 15 knots (28 km/h; 17 mph) with just her port engine; leaving air operations entirely dependent on favorable wind. Repairs to the turbine were proposed at "Bleacher" (Tongatapu, Tonga Islands), where the destroyer tender Whitney was stationed, with four days estimated for the work there. Wasp arrived 18 July for those repairs and on 21 July CTF 18 reported that Wasp had successfully completed a trial making 27 knots with and 25 knot operations were possible with reduced reliability. Replacement turbine blades were available at Pearl Harbor, and repairs there were recommended after the current operations were complete.

Wasp, screened by the heavy cruisers San Francisco and Salt Lake City, and four destroyers, steamed westward toward Guadalcanal on the evening of 6 August until midnight. Then, she changed course to the eastward to reach her launch position 84 nautical miles (97 mi; 156 km) from Tulagi one hour before dawn. Wasp's first combat air patrol fighter took off at 05:57.

The early flights of Wildcats and Dauntlesses were assigned specific targets: Tulagi, Gavutu, Tanambogo, Halavo, Port Purvis on Florida Island, Haleta, Bungana, and the radio station dubbed "Asses' Ears".

The Wildcats, led by Lieutenant Shands and his wingman Ensign S. W. Forrer, patrolled the north coast toward Gavatu. The other two headed for the seaplane facilities at Tanambogo. The Grummans, arriving simultaneously at daybreak, surprised the Japanese and strafed patrol planes and fighter-seaplanes in the area. Fifteen Kawanishi H8K "Emily" flying boats and seven Nakajima A6M2-N "Rufe" floatplane fighters were destroyed by during low-level strafing passes. Shands was credited with four "Rufes" and one "Emily", while his wingman, Forrer, was credited with three "Rufes" and an "Emily" and would later be awarded the Navy Cross for his efforts. Lieutenant Wright and Ensign Kenton were credited with three patrol planes apiece and a motorboat tending the "Emilys"; Ensigns Reeves and Conklin were each credited with two and shared a fifth patrol plane between them. The strafing also destroyed an aviation fuel truck and a truck loaded with spare parts.

Post-attack assessment estimated that the antiaircraft and shore battery sites pinpointed by intelligence had been destroyed by the Dauntless dive bombers in their first attack. None of Wasp's planes were shot down, but Ensign Reeves landed his Wildcat aboard Enterprise after running low on fuel.

At 07:04, Wasp launched 12 Avengers loaded with bombs for use against land targets, and led by Lieutenant H. A. Romberg. The Avengers silenced resistance by bombing Japanese troop concentrations east of the knob of land known as Hill 281, in the Makambo-Sasapi sector, and the prison on Tulagi Island.

Some 10,000 men had been put ashore during the first day's operations against Guadalcanal, and met only slight resistance. On Tulagi, however, the Japanese resisted stoutly, retaining about 1/5 of the island by nightfall. Wasp, Saratoga, and Enterprise, with their screens, retired to the south at nightfall.

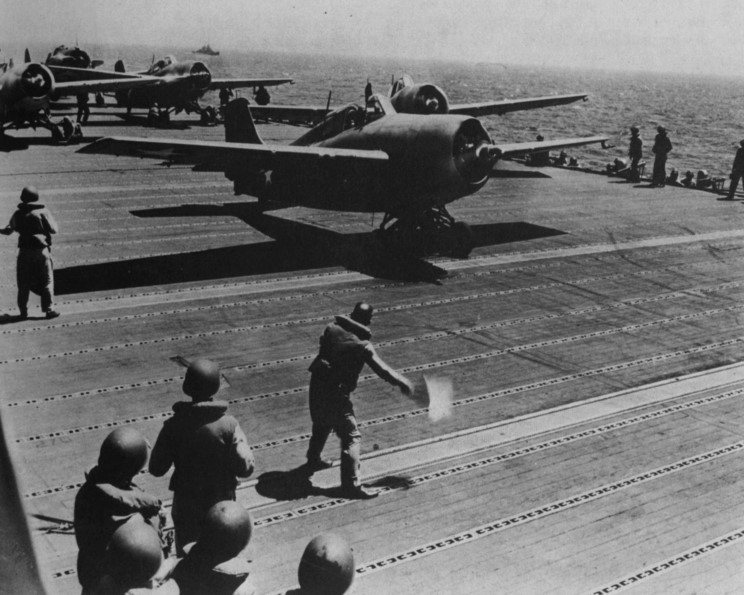
F4Fs launching off Guadalcanal, 7 August 1942.

Wasp fighters led by Lieutenant C. S. Moffett maintained a continuous CAP over the transport area until noon on 8 August. Meanwhile, a scouting flight of 12 Dauntlesses led by Lieutenant Commander E. M. Snowden searched a sector to a radius of 220 nautical miles (250 mi; 410 km) from their carrier, extending it to include all of the Santa Isabel Island and the New Georgia groups. The Dauntless made no contact with the Japanese during their two hours in the air, but at 08:15, Snowden sighted a "Rufe" some 40 nautical miles (46 mi; 74 km) from Rekata Bay and shot the plane down.

Meanwhile, a large group of Japanese planes approached from Bougainville to attack the transports off Lunga Point. Rear Admiral Richmond K. Turner ordered all transports to get underway and to assume cruising disposition. Eldridge was leading a formation of Dauntlesses from VS-71 against Mbangi Island, off Tulagi. His rear seat gunner assumed the formation of Japanese planes were friendly until six Zeroes bounced the first section making 12 unsuccessful firing passes.

Meanwhile, the leader of the last section of VS-71 – Lieutenant, junior grade Robert L. Howard – unsuccessfully attacked twin-engined Mitsubishi G4M "Betty" medium bombers heading for the American transports, and was engaged by four Zeroes escorting the bombers. Howard shot down one Zero with his fixed guns while his rear gunner, Seaman 2nd Class Lawrence P. Lupo, discouraged Japanese fighters attacking from astern.

Over the 7 and 8 August one fighter pilot, Ens. Thaddeus J. Capowski, was reported missing in action when he was separated from the formation but was later found alive and safe. One Dauntless was shot down; the wounded pilot Lieut. Dudley H. Adams was recovered by Dewey but the radioman-gunner Harry E. Elliott was reported to have been killed before the crash. Further one fighter landed in the water but the pilot was recovered, another crashed on the deck and after the injured pilot was recovered the wrecked aircraft jettisoned overboard. A third fighter crashed into the barrier but was repaired and put back into service. Against the loss of three Wildcats and one Dauntless, 15 enemy flying boats, eight floatplane fighters, and one Zero had been destroyed.

At 18:07 on 8 August, Vice Admiral Fletcher recommended to Ghormley that the air support force be withdrawn. Fletcher, concerned by the large numbers of Japanese planes that had attacked on 8 August, reported that he had only 78 fighters left (of 99 he started with) and that fuel for the carriers was running low. Ghormley approved the recommendation, and Wasp joined Enterprise and Saratoga in retiring from Guadalcanal. By midnight, the landing had attained the immediate objectives. Japanese resistance – except for a few snipers – on Gavutu and Tanombogo had been overcome. Early on 9 August, a Japanese surface force engaged an Allied force in the Battle of Savo Island and retired with minimal damage after sinking four Allied heavy cruisers off Savo Island, including two that had served with Wasp in the Atlantic: Vincennes and Quincy.

After the initial day's action in the Solomons campaign, the carrier spent the next month engaged in patrol and covering operations for convoys and resupply units headed for Guadalcanal. The Japanese began transporting reinforcements to contest the Allied forces.

Wasp was ordered south by Vice Admiral Fletcher to refuel and did not participate in the Battle of the Eastern Solomons on 24 August. After fueling on 24 August Wasp hurried to the battle zone. Her total aircraft group was 26 Grumman F4F Wildcats, 25 Douglas SBD Dauntlesses, and 11 Grumman TBF Avengers. (One Dauntless had been lost on 24 August, ditching in the sea because of engine trouble). On the morning of 25 August, Wasp launched a search mission. The Dauntless of pilot Lieut. Chester V. Zalewski shot down two Aichi E13A1 "Jake" floatplanes from Japanese cruiser Atago (Vice Admiral Nobutake Kondō's flagship). But the Dauntlesses sighted no ships. The Japanese fleet had withdrawn out of range. At 13:26 on 25 August, Wasp launched a search/attack mission of 24 Dauntlesses and 10 Avengers against the convoy of Rear Admiral Raizo Tanaka that seemed to be still within range. Although the SBD Dauntlesses shot down a flying boat, they could not find the enemy ships anymore.

During the battle on 24 August, Enterprise was damaged and had to return to port for repairs. Saratoga was torpedoed a week later and departed for repairs as well. That left only two carriers in the southwest Pacific: Wasp and Hornet, which had been in commission for only a year.

== Loss ==
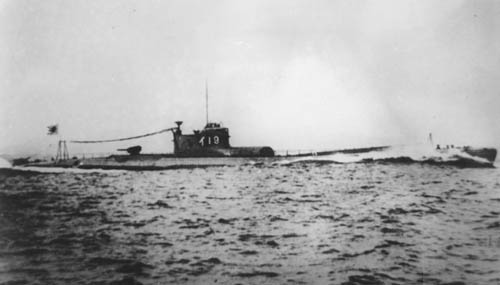
Japanese submarine I-19 in 1943

On Tuesday, 15 September 1942, Wasp and Hornet, together with North Carolina and 10 other warships, were escorting the transports carrying the 7th Marine Regiment to Guadalcanal as reinforcements. Wasp was operating some 150 nautical miles (170 mi; 280 km) southeast of San Cristobal Island. Her aircraft were being refueled and rearmed for antisubmarine patrol missions and Wasp had been at general quarters from an hour before sunrise until the time when the morning search returned to the ship at 10:00. Thereafter, the ship was in condition 2, with the air department at flight quarters. The only contact with the Japanese that day had been a Japanese four-engined flying boat that was downed by one of Wasp's F4F Wildcats at 12:15.

About 14:20, the carrier turned into the wind to launch eight Wildcats and eighteen Dauntlesses and to recover eight Wildcats and three Dauntlesses that had been airborne since before noon. Lt. (jg) Roland H. Kenton, USNR, flying a Wildcat of VF-71 was the last aircraft off the deck of Wasp. The ship rapidly completed the recovery of the 11 aircraft before turning to starboard, heeling slightly as she did so. At 14:44 a lookout reported "three torpedoes ... three points forward of the starboard beam".

A spread of six Type 95 torpedoes was fired at Wasp at about 14:44 from the tubes of the Type B1 submarine I-19. Wasp put over her rudder hard to starboard to avoid the salvo, but it was too late. Two or three torpedoes struck in quick succession about 14:45; an initial damage report prepared by Capt. Sherman as he returned to the west coast, based on his observations and those of men traveling home on the same vessel as he, stated three, but a subsequent report by the Bureau of Ships, released four months later and based on interviews with a greater number of survivors, concluded that the third blast, 20 seconds after the first two, was a secondary explosion triggered by one of the others. Whatever the case, all hit in the vicinity of the ship's gasoline tanks and magazines. Two of the spread of torpedoes passed ahead of Wasp and were observed passing astern of Helena before O'Brien was hit by one at 14:51 while maneuvering to avoid the other (structural damage from this torpedo hit would eventually lead to O'Brien's sinking a month later). The sixth torpedo passed either astern or under Wasp, narrowly missed Lansdowne in Wasp's screen about 14:48, and struck North Carolina about 14:52.

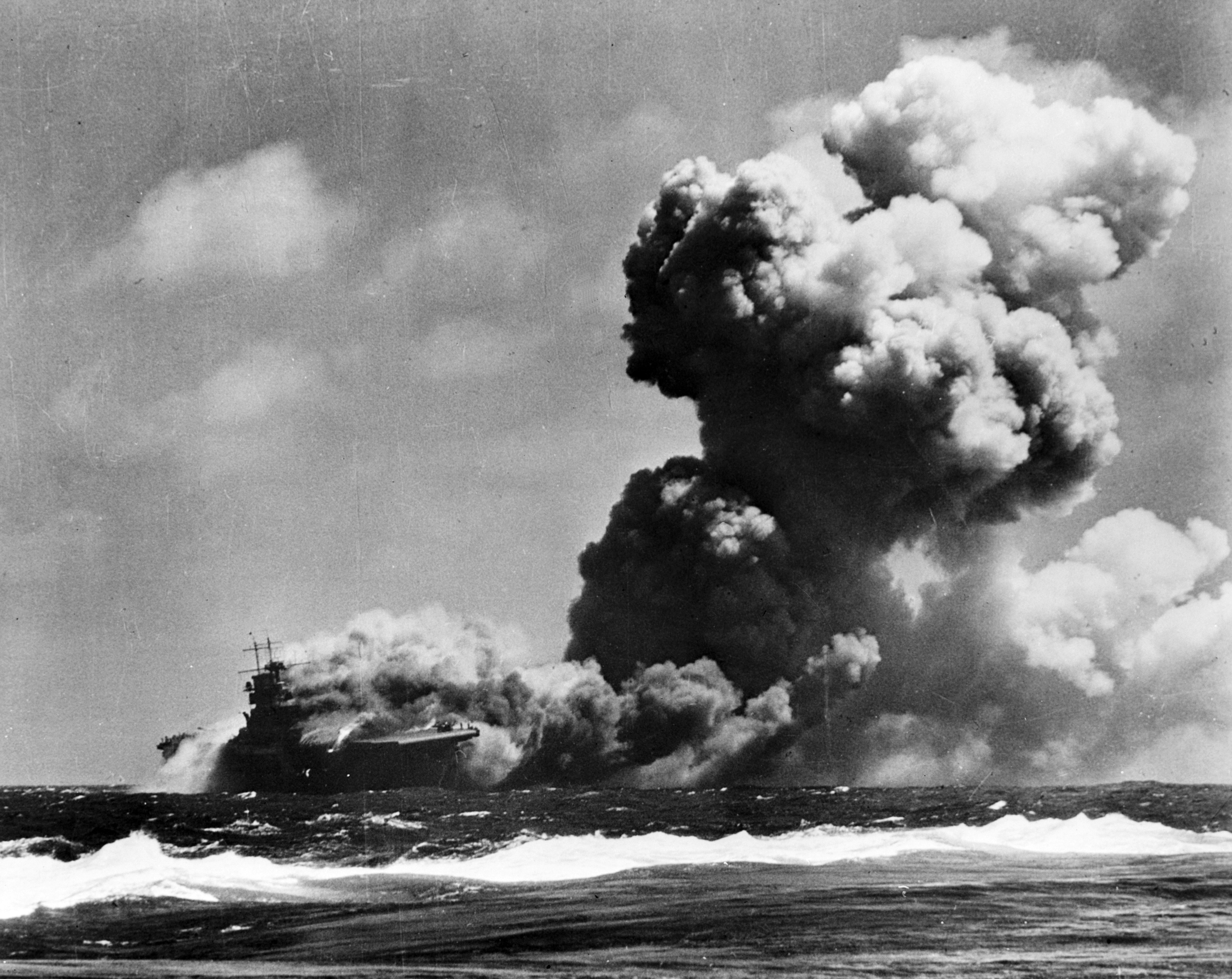
Wasp on fire shortly after being torpedoed.

There was a rapid succession of explosions in the forward part of Wasp. Aircraft on the flight and hangar decks were thrown about and dropped on the deck with such force that landing gear snapped. Aircraft suspended overhead in the hangar fell onto those on the hangar deck; fires broke out in the hangar and below decks. Soon, the heat of the intense gasoline fires detonated the ready ammunition at the forward anti-aircraft guns on the starboard side, and fragments showered the forward part of the ship. The number two 1.1 in (28 mm) mount was blown overboard.

Water mains in the forward part of the ship had been rendered inoperable, meaning no water was available to fight the forward fires, which continued to set off ammunition, bombs, and gasoline. As the ship listed 10–15° to starboard, oil and gasoline, released from the tanks by the torpedo hit, caught fire on the water.

Captain Sherman slowed to 10 knots (12 mph; 19 km/h), ordering the rudder put to port to try to get the wind on the starboard bow; he then went astern with right rudder until the wind was on the starboard quarter, in an attempt to keep the fire forward. At that point, flames made the central station unusable, and communication circuits went dead. Soon, a serious gasoline fire broke out in the forward portion of the hangar; within 24 minutes of the initial attack, there were three additional major gasoline vapor explosions. Ten minutes later Sherman decided to abandon ship as the firefighting was ineffectual. Survivors would have to disembark quickly to minimize loss of life.

After consulting with Rear Admiral Leigh Noyes, Captain Sherman ordered "abandon ship" at 15:20. All badly injured men were lowered into rafts or rubber boats. Many unwounded men had to abandon ship from aft because the forward fires were burning with such intensity. The departure, as Sherman observed it, looked "orderly", and there was no panic. The only delays occurred when many men showed reluctance to leave until all the wounded had been taken off. The abandonment took nearly 40 minutes, and at 16:00 Sherman abandoned the ship once he was satisfied all survivors had been evacuated. In all 193 men had died and 366 were wounded during the attack. All but one of her 26 airborne aircraft made a safe landing on Hornet nearby but 45 aircraft went down with the ship.

Although the submarine hazard caused the accompanying destroyers to lie well clear or to shift position, they carried out rescue operations until Laffey, Lansdowne, Helena, and Salt Lake City had 1,946 men embarked. The fires on Wasp, drifting, traveled aft and there were four violent explosions at nightfall. Lansdowne was ordered to torpedo the carrier and stand by until she was sunk. Lansdowne's Mark 15 torpedoes had the same unrecognized flaws reported for the Mark 14 torpedo. The first two torpedoes were fired perfectly, but did not explode, leaving Lansdowne with only three more. The magnetic influence exploders on these were disabled and the depth set at 10 feet (3.0 m). All three detonated, but Wasp remained afloat for some time, sinking bow-first at 21:00. Another Japanese submarine, I-15, observed and reported the sinking of Wasp, as other US destroyers kept I-19 busy. I-19 avoided 80 depth charges and escaped safely. She was subsequently sunk with all hands in a depth charge attack on 25 November 1943 by destroyer USS Radford.

== Wreck located ==
On 14 January 2019, Wasp's wreck was located by the research vessel Petrel. The carrier sits upright in 14,255 feet (4,345 m) of water, though parts of the hull appear to have split.

== Awards ==

American Defense Service Medal with "A" Device		American Campaign Medal
European-African-Middle; Eastern Campaign Medal with 1 star	Asiatic-Pacific Campaign Medal with 1 star	World War II Victory Medal

== See also ==
- USS Shea - named for Commander John Shea, who died during the sinking of Wasp

== Bibliography ==
- Wright, Christopher C. (September 2019). "Question 7/56: Concerning What Radar Systems Were Installed on U.S. Asiatic Fleet Ships in December 1941". Warship International. LVI (3): 192–198. ISSN 0043-0374.
