= VF-71 =

Fighter Squadron 71
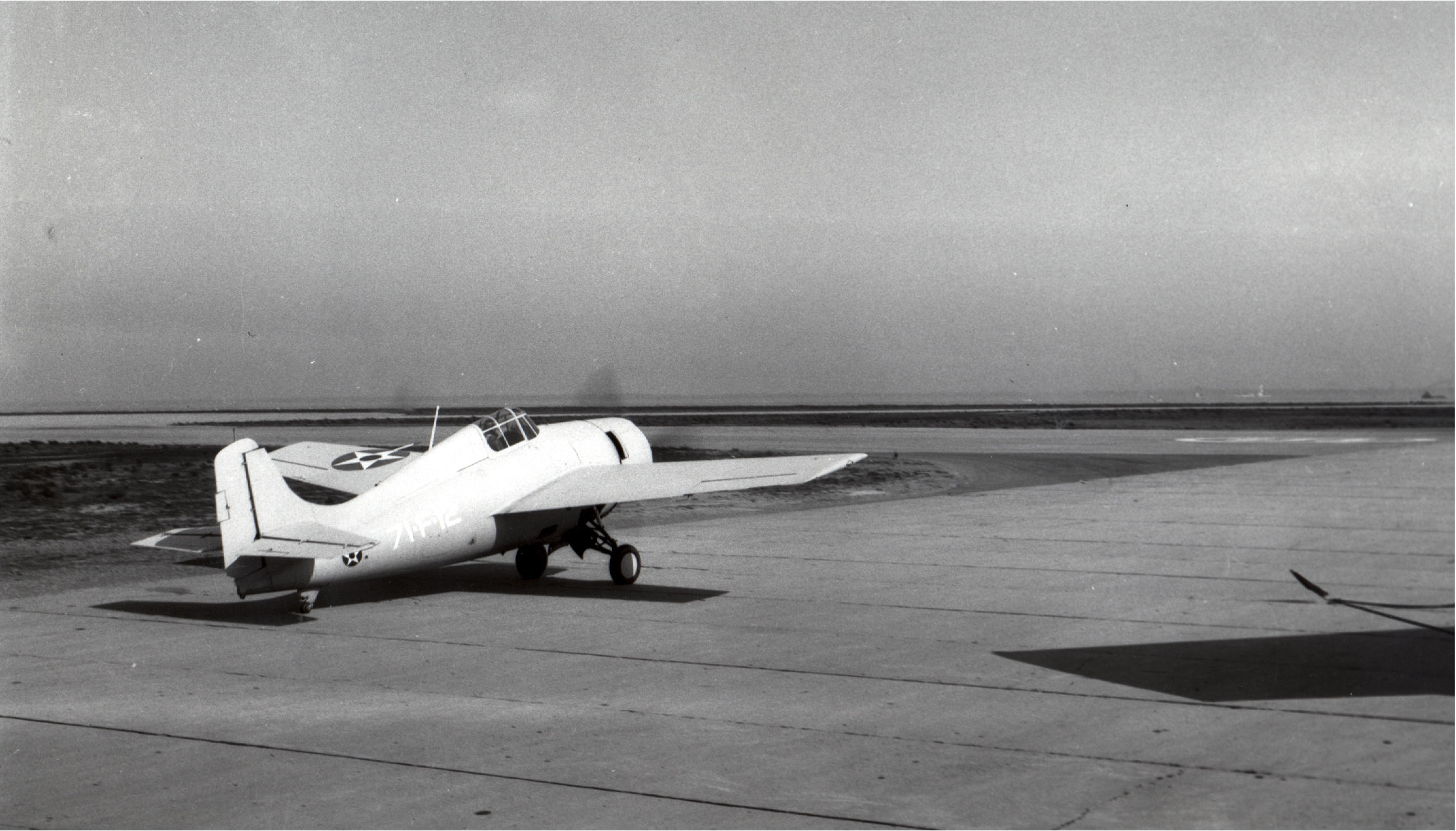
- VF-71 F4F-3 at NAS Norfolk in 1941
- Active: 1 July 1939 – 7 January 1943
- Country: United States
- Branch: United States Navy
- Type: Fighter
- Engagements: World War II

Aircraft flown
- Fighter: F4F-3 Wildcat

Fighter Squadron 71 or VF-71 was an aviation unit of the United States Navy. Originally established as Bombing Squadron 7 (VB-7) on 1 July 1939, it was redesignated as VF-71 on 5 November 1940 and disestablished on 7 January 1943. It was the first US Navy squadron to be designated as VF-71.

== Operational history ==
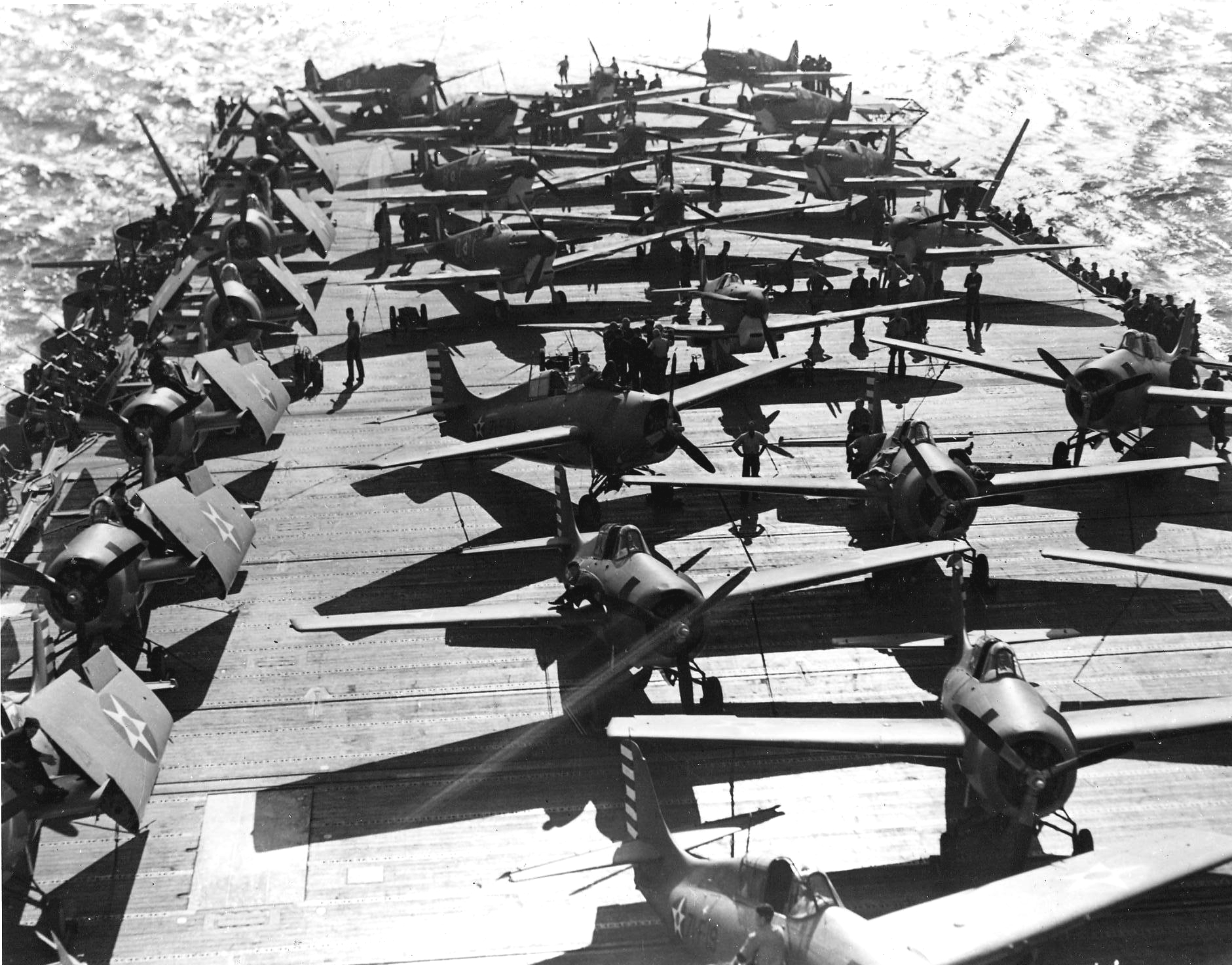
VF-71 F4Fs and Spitfires on the deck of USS Wasp in April 1942

VF-71 was deployed on board the USS Wasp and in April 1942 supported Operation Calendar to deliver Supermarine Spitfire fighter aircraft to Malta.

Wasp was transferred to the Pacific Fleet in June 1942 and supported the invasion of Guadalcanal in August 1942. Many of the squadron's aircraft were lost in the sinking of the Wasp on 15 September 1942. The squadron was then land-based at Palikulo Bay Airfield on Espiritu Santo, and some supplemented the defense of Guadalcanal as part of the Cactus Air Force. VF-71 scored seven kills before its disestablishment.

== See also ==
- History of the United States Navy
- List of inactive United States Navy aircraft squadrons
- List of United States Navy aircraft squadrons
