= Allied invasion of Sicily =

Part of World War II in 1943

Operation Husky
- Part of the Italian campaign of World War II
- A map of Allied progress during Operation Husky from 11 July to 17 August 1943.
Date	9 July – 17 August 1943 (1 month, 1 week and 1 day)
Location	Sicily, Italy
Result	Allied victory
Territorial changes	Sicily occupied by Allied forces

Belligerents
United States; United Kingdom; Canada; Free France; Australia; Kingdom of Greece	Italy; Germany

Commanders and leaders
AFHQ: Dwight D. Eisenhower; 15th Army Group: Harold Alexander; Seventh Army: George S. Patton; Eighth Army: Bernard Montgomery; Naval forces: Andrew Cunningham; (Kingdom of Greece) Alexandros Sakellariou; Air forces: Arthur Tedder	Comando Supremo: Vittorio Ambrosio; OB South: Albert Kesselring; 6th Army: Alfredo Guzzoni; XIV Panzer Corps: Hans-Valentin Hube

Strength
Initial strength: 160,000 personnel; 600 tanks; 14,000 vehicles; 1,800 guns; Peak strength: 467,000 personnel	(Kingdom of Italy) Italy: 131,359–252,000 personnel (Note: Including Navy and Air Force personnel.); 260 tanks; 1,400 aircraft; (Nazi Germany) Germany: 40,000–60,000 personnel

Casualties and losses
United Kingdom and Canada: 2,938 killed; 9,212 wounded; 2,782 missing; United States: 2,811 killed; 6,471 wounded; 686 missing	(Kingdom of Italy) Italy: 4,678 killed; 32,500 wounded; 116,861 captured or missing; (Nazi Germany) Germany: 4,325 killed; 13,500 wounded; 10,106 captured or missing

The Allied invasion of Sicily, also known as the Battle of Sicily and Operation Husky, was a major campaign of World War II in which Allied forces invaded the Italian island of Sicily in July 1943 and took it from the Axis forces. The island was defended by the Italian 6th Army and the German XIV Panzer Corps. The invasion paved the way for the Allied invasion of mainland Italy and initiated the Italian campaign that removed Italy from the war.

With the conclusion of the North Africa campaign in May 1943, the victorious Allies had for the first time ejected the Axis powers from a theatre of war. Now at Italy's doorstep, the Allied powers—led by the United States and United Kingdom—decided to attack Axis forces in Europe via Italy, rather than Western Europe, due to the wavering Italian morale, control over Mediterranean sea lanes, and the vulnerability of German supply lines along the Italian Peninsula.

To divert some Axis forces to other areas, the Allies engaged in deception operations, the most successful of which was Operation Mincemeat. Operation Husky began on the night of 9/10 July 1943 with a large amphibious and airborne operation, followed by a six-week land campaign that ended on 17 August.

The Allies achieved their primary aims, Axis air, land and naval forces were driven from the island and the Mediterranean was opened to Allied merchant ships for the first time since 1941. These events led to the ousting of Italian leader Benito Mussolini and the fall of his regime, which was replaced by the First Badoglio government. Italy's collapse necessitated German troops replacing Italian forces in the country, and to a lesser extent the Balkans, resulting in one-fifth of the German army being diverted from the Eastern Front, a proportion that would remain until near the end of the war.

== Background ==
=== Allies ===
The plan for Operation Husky called for the amphibious assault of Sicily by two Allied armies, one landing on the south-eastern and one on the central southern coast. The amphibious assaults were to be supported by naval gunfire, as well as tactical bombing, interdiction and close air support by the combined air forces. As such, the operation required a complex command structure, incorporating land, naval and air forces. The overall commander was American General Dwight D. Eisenhower, as Commander-in-Chief (C-in-C) of all the Allied forces in North Africa. British General Sir Harold Alexander acted as his second-in-command and as the 15th Army Group commander. The American Major General Walter Bedell Smith was appointed as Eisenhower's Chief of Staff. The overall Naval Force Commander was the British Admiral Sir Andrew Cunningham.

The Allied land forces were from the American, British and Canadian armies, and were structured as two task forces. The Eastern Task Force (also known as Task Force 545) was led by General Sir Bernard Montgomery and consisted of the British Eighth Army (which included the 1st Canadian Infantry Division). The Western Task Force (Task Force 343) was commanded by Lieutenant General George S. Patton and consisted of the American Seventh Army. The two task force commanders reported to Alexander as commander of the 15th Army Group.

The U.S. Seventh Army consisted initially of three infantry divisions, organized under II Corps, commanded by Lieutenant General Omar Bradley. The 1st and 3rd Infantry Divisions, commanded by Major Generals Terry Allen and Lucian Truscott respectively, sailed from ports in Tunisia, while the 45th Infantry Division, under Major General Troy H. Middleton, sailed from the United States via Oran in Algeria. The 2nd Armored Division, under Major General Hugh Joseph Gaffey, also sailing from Oran, was to be a floating reserve and be fed into combat as required. On 15 July, Patton reorganized his command into two corps by creating a new Provisional Corps headquarters, commanded by his deputy army commander, Major General Geoffrey Keyes.

The British Eighth Army had four infantry divisions and an independent infantry brigade organized under XIII Corps, commanded by Lieutenant-General Sir Miles Dempsey, and XXX Corps, commanded by Lieutenant-General Sir Oliver Leese. The two divisions of XIII Corps, the 5th and 50th (Northumbrian) Infantry Divisions, commanded by Major-Generals Horatio Berney-Ficklin and Sidney Kirkman, sailed from Suez in Egypt. The formations of XXX Corps sailed from more diverse ports: the 1st Canadian Infantry Division, under Major-General Guy Simonds, sailed from the United Kingdom, the 51st (Highland) Infantry Division, under Major-General Douglas Wimberley, from Tunisia and Malta, and the 231st Independent Infantry Brigade Group from Suez.

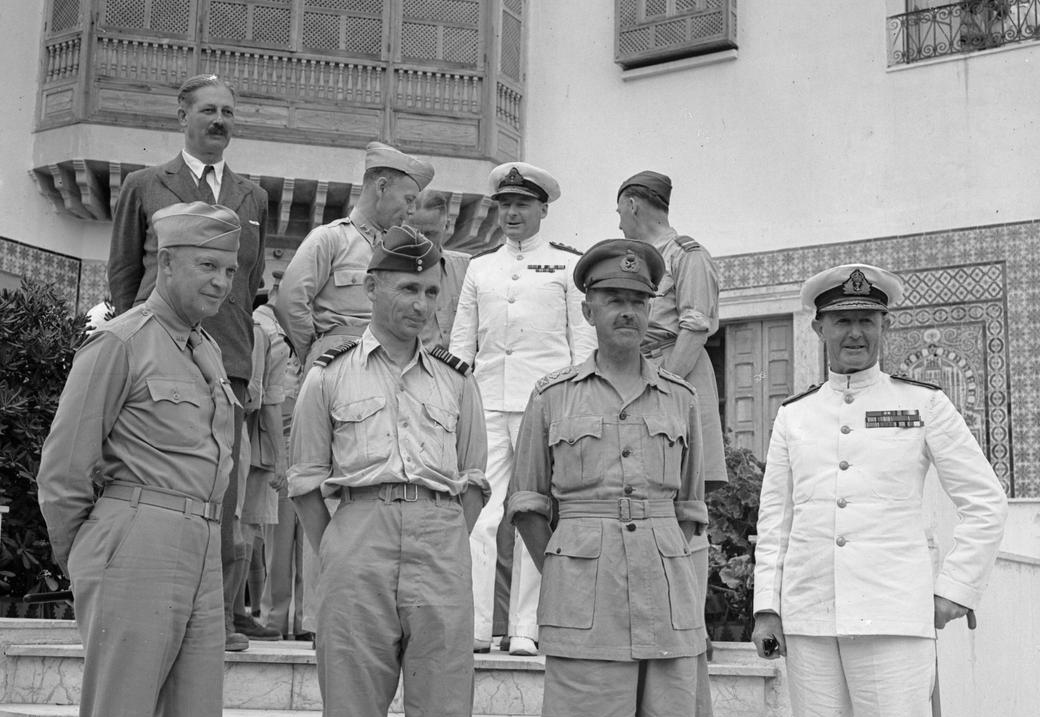
Allied leaders in the Sicilian campaign. General Dwight D. Eisenhower meets in North Africa with (foreground, left to right): Air Chief Marshal Sir Arthur Tedder, General Sir Harold Alexander, Admiral Sir Andrew Cunningham, and (top row): Mr. Harold Macmillan, Major General Walter Bedell Smith, an unidentified British officer, and Air Marshal H E P Wigglesworth.

The 1st Canadian Infantry Division was included in Operation Husky at the insistence of the Canadian Prime Minister, William Mackenzie King, and the Canadian Military Headquarters in the United Kingdom. This request was granted by the British, displacing the veteran British 3rd Infantry Division. The change was not finalized until 27 April 1943, when Lieutenant-General Andrew McNaughton, then commanding the Canadian First Army in the United Kingdom, deemed Operation Husky to be a viable military undertaking and agreed to the detachment of both the 1st Canadian Infantry Division and the 1st Canadian Tank Brigade. The "Red Patch Division" was added to Leese's XXX Corps to become part of the British Eighth Army.

In addition to the amphibious landings, airborne troops were to be flown in to support both the Western and Eastern Task Forces. To the east, the British 1st Airborne Division, commanded by Major-General George F. Hopkinson, was to seize vital bridges and high ground in support of the British Eighth Army. The initial plan dictated that the U.S. 82nd Airborne Division, commanded by Major General Matthew Ridgway, was to be held as a tactical reserve in Tunisia.

Allied naval forces were also grouped into two task forces to transport and support the invading armies. The Eastern Naval Task Force was formed from the British Mediterranean Fleet and was commanded by Admiral Bertram Ramsay. The Western Naval Task Force was formed around the U.S. Eighth Fleet, commanded by Admiral Henry Kent Hewitt. The two naval task force commanders reported to Admiral Cunningham as overall Naval Forces Commander. Two sloops of the Royal Indian Navy – HMIS Sutlej and HMIS Jumna – also participated.

At the time of Operation Husky, the Allied air forces in North Africa and the Mediterranean were organized into the Mediterranean Air Command (MAC) under Air Chief Marshal Sir Arthur Tedder. The major sub-command of MAC was the Northwest African Air Forces (NAAF) under the command of Lieutenant General Carl Spaatz with headquarters in Tunisia. NAAF consisted primarily of groups from the United States 12th Air Force, 9th Air Force, and the British Royal Air Force (RAF) that provided the primary air support for the operation. Other groups from the 9th Air Force under Lieutenant General Lewis H. Brereton operating from Tunisia and Egypt, and Air H.Q. Malta under Air Vice-Marshal Sir Keith Park operating from the island of Malta, also provided important air support.

The U.S. Army Air Force 9th Air Force's medium bombers and P-40 fighters that were detached to NAAF's Northwest African Tactical Air Force under the command of Air Marshal Sir Arthur Coningham moved to southern airfields on Sicily as soon they were secured. At the time, the 9th Air Force was a sub-command of RAF Middle East Command under Air Chief Marshal Sir Sholto Douglas. Middle East Command, like NAAF and Air H.Q. Malta were sub-commands of MAC under Tedder who reported to Eisenhower for NAAF operations and to the British Chiefs of Staff for Air H.Q. Malta and Middle East Command operations.

=== Axis ===
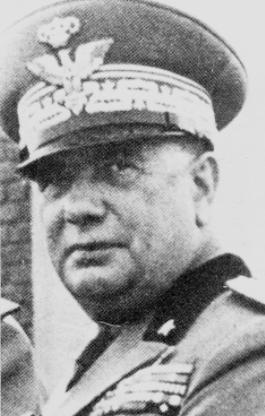
General Alfredo Guzzoni, Supreme Commander of Axis forces in Sicily

The island was defended by the two corps of the Italian 6th Army under General Alfredo Guzzoni, although specially designated Fortress Areas around the main ports (Piazze Militari Marittime), were commanded by admirals subordinate to Naval Headquarters and independent of the 6th Army. In early July, the total Axis force in Sicily was about 200,000 Italian troops, 32,000 German troops and 30,000 Luftwaffe ground staff. The main German formations were the Panzer Division Hermann Göring and the 15th Panzergrenadier Division. The Panzer division had 99 tanks in two battalions but was short of infantry (with only three battalions), while the 15th Panzergrenadier Division had three grenadier regiments and a tank battalion with 60 tanks. About half of the Italian troops were formed into four front-line infantry divisions and headquarters troops; the remainder were support troops or inferior coastal divisions and coastal brigades. Guzzoni's defence plan was for the coastal formations to form a screen to receive the invasion and allow time for the field divisions further back to intervene.

Map of the Allied and Axis dispositions on 10 July 1943

By late July, the German units had been reinforced, principally by elements of the 1st Parachute Division, 29th Panzergrenadier Division and the XIV Panzer Corps headquarters (General der Panzertruppe Hans-Valentin Hube), bringing the number of German troops to around 70,000. Until the arrival of the corps headquarters, the two German divisions were nominally under Italian tactical control. The panzer division, with a reinforced infantry regiment from the panzergrenadier division to compensate for its lack of infantry, was under Italian XVI Corps and the rest of the panzergrenadier division under the Italian XII Corps. The German commanders in Sicily were contemptuous of their allies and German units took their orders from the German liaison officer attached to the 6th Army HQ, Generalleutnant Fridolin von Senger und Etterlin who was subordinate to Generalfeldmarschall Albert Kesselring, the German C-in-C Army Command South (OB Süd). Von Senger had arrived in Sicily in late June as part of a German plan to gain greater operational control of its units. Guzzoni agreed from 16 July to delegate to Hube control of all sectors where there were German units involved, and from 2 August, he commanded the Sicilian front.

=== Planning ===
Sicily (red) in relation to the Italian mainland

At the Casablanca Conference in January 1943, with the end of the North African Campaign in sight, the political leaders and the military Chiefs of Staff of the United States and Britain met to discuss strategy. The British Chiefs of Staff were in favour of an invasion of Sicily or Sardinia, arguing that it would force Germany to disperse its forces and might knock Italy out of the war and move Turkey to join the Allies. At first, the Americans opposed the plan as opportunistic and irrelevant, but were persuaded to agree to a Sicilian invasion on the grounds of the great savings to Allied shipping that would result from the opening of the Mediterranean by the removal of Axis air and naval forces from the island. The Combined Chiefs of Staff appointed General Eisenhower as C-in-C of the Allied Expeditionary Force, General Alexander as Deputy C-in-C with responsibility for detailed planning and execution of the operation, Admiral Cunningham as Naval Commander, and Air Chief Marshal Tedder as Air Commander.

The outline plan given to Eisenhower by the Chiefs of Staff involved dispersed landings by brigade and division-sized formations in the south-east, south and north-west areas of the island. The logic behind the plan was that it would result in the rapid capture of key Axis airfields that posed a threat to the beachheads and the invasion fleet lying off them. It would also see the rapid capture of all the main ports on the island, except for Messina, including Catania, Palermo, Syracuse, Licata and Augusta. This would facilitate a rapid Allied build-up, as well as denying their use to the Axis. High-level planning for the operation lacked direction because the three mainland commanders, Alexander, Montgomery, and Patton, were fully occupied in operations in Tunisia. Effort was wasted in presenting plans that Montgomery, in particular, disliked because of the dispersion of forces involved. He was finally able to articulate his objections and put forward alternative proposals on 24 April. Tedder and Cunningham opposed Montgomery's plan because it would leave 13 landing grounds in Axis hands, posing a considerable threat to the Allied invasion fleet.

Eisenhower called a meeting for 2 May with Montgomery, Cunningham and Tedder, in which Montgomery made new proposals to concentrate the Allied effort on the southeast corner of Sicily, discarding the intended landings close to Palermo and using the south-eastern ports. After Alexander joined the meeting on 3 May, Montgomery's proposals were finally accepted on the basis that it was better to take an administrative risk (having to support troops by landing supplies across beaches) than an operational one (dispersion of effort). Not for the last time, Montgomery had argued a sound course of action, yet done so in a conceited manner, which suggested to others, particularly his American allies, that he was preoccupied with his own interests. In the event, maintaining the armies by landing supplies across the beaches proved easier than expected, partly because of the successful introduction of large numbers of the new amphibious DUKW vehicle. Alexander was later to write "It is not too much to say that the DUKW revolutionised the problem of beach maintenance."

On 17 May, Alexander issued his Operation Instruction No. 1 setting out his broad plan and defining the tasks of the two armies. Broadly speaking, he intended to establish his armies along a line from Catania to Licata preparatory to a final operation to reduce the island. He later wrote that at that stage it was not practicable to plan further ahead but that his intentions were clear in his own mind what the next step would be: he would drive north ultimately to Santo Stefano on the northern coast to split the island in two and cut his enemy's east–west communications. The Seventh Army was assigned to land in the Gulf of Gela, in south-central Sicily, with the 3rd Infantry Division and 2nd Armored Division to the west at Licata Mollarella beach, 1st Division in the center at Gela, and 45th Division to the east at Scoglitti. The 82nd Airborne Division was assigned to drop behind the defences at Gela and Scoglitti. The Seventh Army's beach-front stretched over 50 kilometers (30 mi). The British Eighth Army was assigned to land in south-eastern Sicily. XXX Corps would land on either side of Cape Passero, while XIII Corps would land in the Gulf of Noto, around Avola, off to the north. The Eighth Army's beach front also stretched 40 kilometers (25 mi), and there was a gap of some 40 kilometers (25 mi) between the two armies.

==== Preparatory operations ====
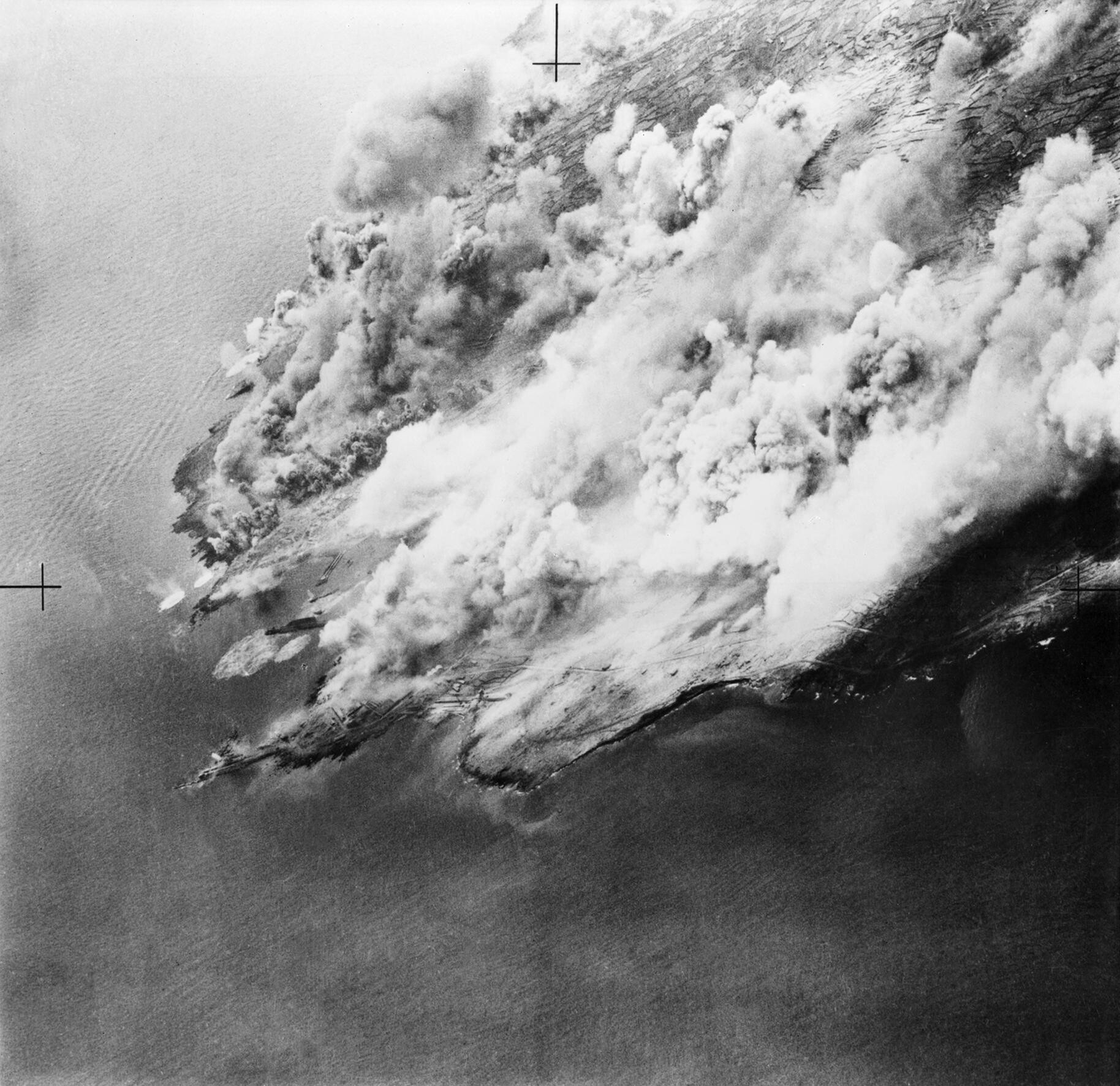
Aerial view of the island of Pantelleria wreathed in smoke from bursting bombs during the Allied bombardment

Once the Axis forces had been defeated in Tunisia, the Allied strategic bomber force commenced attacks on the principal airfields of Sardinia, Sicily and southern Italy, industrial targets in southern Italy and the ports of Naples, Messina, Palermo and Cagliari (in Sardinia). The attacks were spread to maintain uncertainty as to the next Allied move, and to pin down Axis aircraft and keep them away from Sicily. Bombing of northern Italy (by aircraft based in the UK) and Greece (by aircraft based in the Middle East) was increased. From 3 July, bombing concentrated on Sicilian airfields and Axis communications with Italy, although beach defences were left alone, to preserve surprise as to where the landings would occur.

By 10 July, only two airfields in Sicily remained fully operational and over half the Axis aircraft had been forced to leave the island. Between mid-May and the invasion, Allied airmen flew 42,227 sorties and destroyed 323 German and 105 Italian aircraft, for the loss of 250 aircraft, mostly to anti-aircraft fire over Sicily.

Operations began in May against the small island of Pantelleria, some 110 km (70 mi) southwest of Sicily and 240 km (150 mi) northwest of Malta, to prevent the airfield there being used in support of Axis troops attempting to withdraw from North Africa. On 13 and 31 May the cruiser HMS Orion bombarded the island and from 6 June, Allied attacks increased. From 8 May to 11 June 5,285 bombing sorties were flown by fighter-bombers, medium and heavy bombers, dropping a total of 6,202 tons of bombs on the island. The Italian gun positions were reduced to 47% effectiveness by the intense ten-day air bombardment. Out of 112 guns bombed, 2 had suffered from direct hits, 17 were near misses and 34 were damaged by debris and splinters (10 beyond repair). All control communications were destroyed, along with many gun emplacements and ammunition stores.

On 11 June, after a naval bombardment and seaborne landing by the British 1st Infantry Division (Operation Corkscrew) the island garrison surrendered. The Pelagian Islands of Lampedusa and Linosa, some 140 km (90 mi) west of Malta, followed in short order on 12 June.

==== Headquarters ====
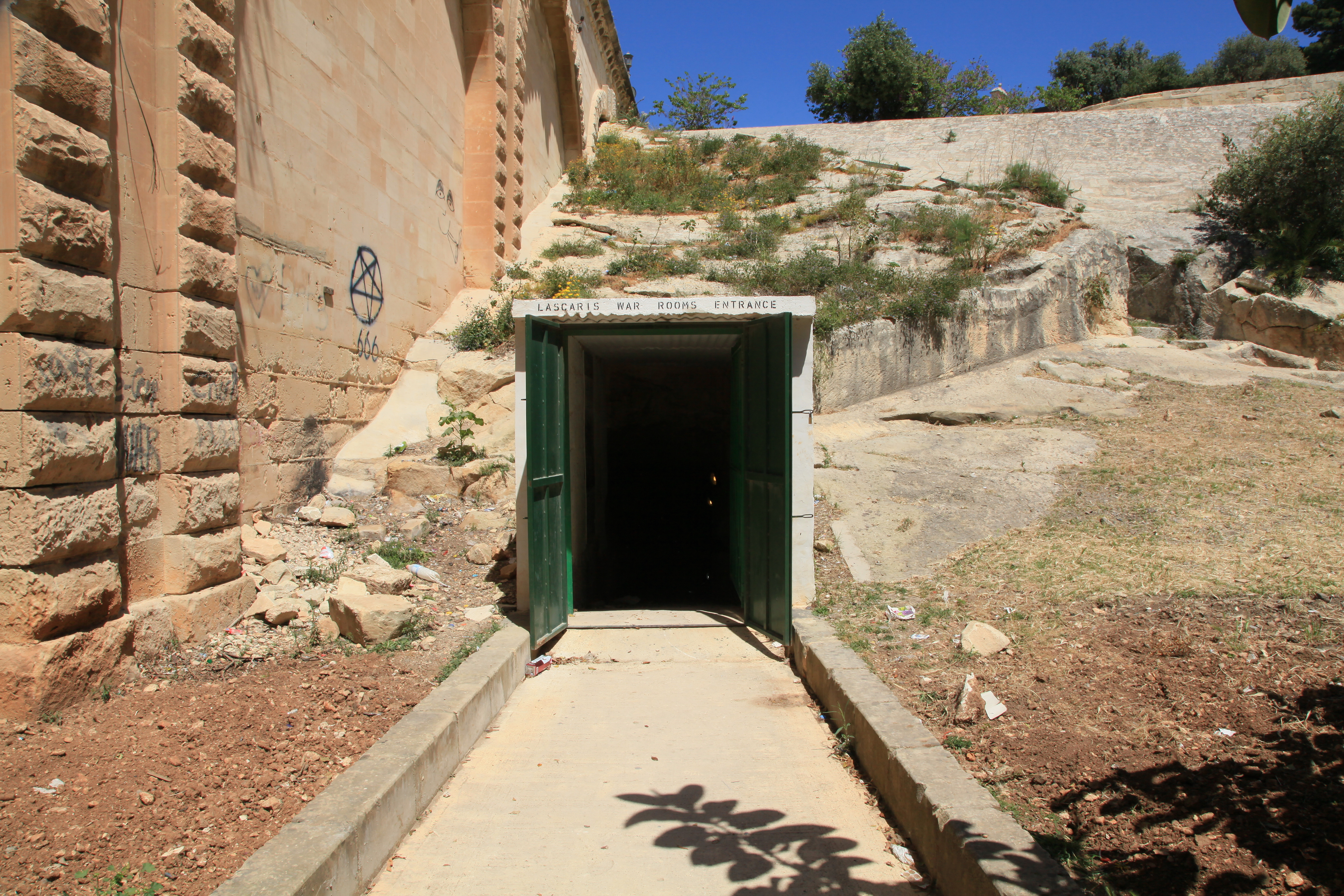
Lascaris War Rooms

The Allies used a network of tunnels and chambers located below the Lascaris Battery in Valletta, Malta (the "Lascaris War Rooms"), for the advance headquarters of the invasion of Sicily. In July 1943, General Eisenhower, Admiral Cunningham, General Montgomery, and Air Marshal Tedder occupied the war rooms. Earlier, the war rooms had served as the British headquarters for the defence of Malta.

==== Deception ====
To distract the Axis, and if possible divert some of their forces to other areas, the Allies engaged in several deception operations. The most famous and successful of these was Operation Mincemeat, conceived by Naval intelligence officer Ewen Montagu and RAF Squadron Leader Charles Cholmondeley. The British allowed a corpse, disguised as a British Royal Marines officer, to drift ashore in Spain carrying a briefcase containing fake secret documents. The documents purported to reveal that the Allies were planning "Operation Brimstone" and that an "Operation Husky" was an invasion of Greece. German intelligence accepted the authenticity of the documents and the Germans diverted much of their defensive effort from Sicily to Greece until the occupation of Pantelleria on 11 June, which concentrated German and Italian attention on the western Mediterranean. Generalfeldmarschall Erwin Rommel was sent to Greece to assume command. The Germans transferred a group of "R boats" (German minesweepers and minelayers) from Sicily and laid three additional minefields off the Greek coast. They also moved three panzer divisions to Greece, one from France and two from the Eastern Front which reduced German combat strength in the Kursk salient.

== Campaign ==
=== Allied landings ===
==== Airborne landings ====
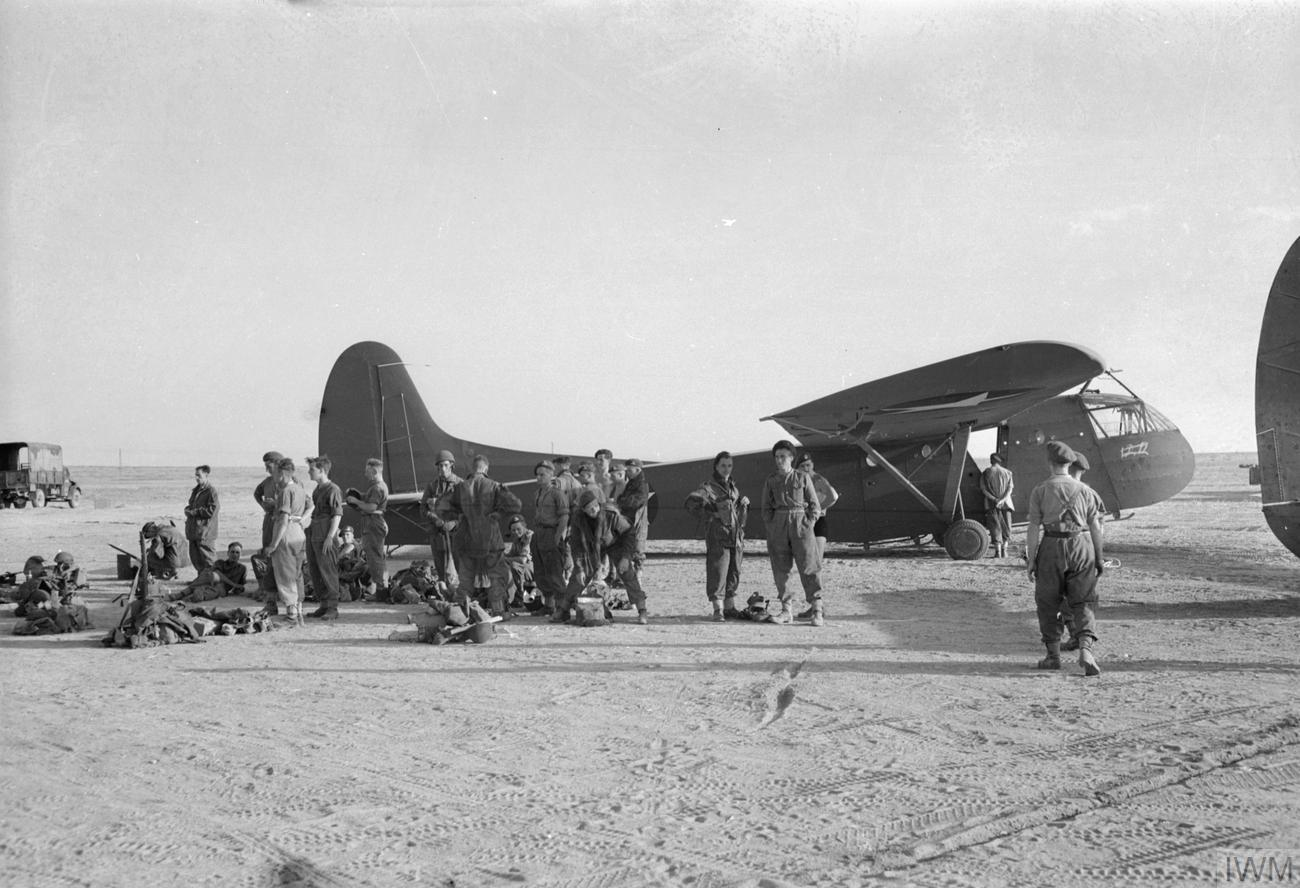
British airborne troops wait to board an American WACO CG4A glider.

Two American and two British attacks by airborne troops were carried out just after midnight on the night of 9–10 July, as part of the invasion. The American paratroopers consisted largely of Colonel James M. Gavin's 505th Parachute Infantry Regiment (expanded into the 505th Parachute Regimental Combat Team with the addition of the 3rd Battalion of the 504th Parachute Infantry Regiment, along with the 456th Parachute Field Artillery Battalion, Company 'B' of the 307th Airborne Engineer Battalion and other supporting units) of the U.S. 82nd Airborne Division, making their first combat drop. The British landings were preceded by pathfinders of the 21st Independent Parachute Company, who were to mark landing zones for the troops who were intending to seize the Ponte Grande, the bridge over the River Anape just south of Syracuse, and hold it until the British 5th Infantry Division arrived from the beaches at Cassibile, some eleven kilometres (7 mi) to the south. Glider infantry from the British 1st Airborne Division's 1st Airlanding Brigade, commanded by Brigadier Philip Hicks, were to seize landing zones inland.

Strong winds of up to 70 km/h (45 mph) blew the troop-carrying aircraft off course and the American force was scattered widely over south-east Sicily between Gela and Syracuse. By 14 July, about two-thirds of the 505th had managed to concentrate, and half the U.S. paratroopers failed to reach their rallying points. The British air-landing troops fared little better, as only 12 of the 147 gliders landed on target and 69 crashed into the sea, drowning over 200 men. Among those who landed in the sea were Major General George F. Hopkinson, commander of the British 1st Airborne Division, who, after several hours spent clutching a piece of wreckage, was eventually rescued by the landing ship HMS Keren. The scattered airborne troops attacked patrols and created confusion wherever possible. A platoon of the 2nd Battalion, South Staffordshire Regiment, under Lieutenant Louis Withers, part of the British 1st Airlanding Brigade, landed on target, captured Ponte Grande and repulsed counterattacks. Additional paratroops rallied to the sound of shooting and by 08:30 that morning, eighty-nine men were holding the bridge. By 11:30, a battalion of the Italian 75th Infantry Regiment (Colonel Francesco Ronco) from the 54th Infantry Division "Napoli" arrived with some artillery. The British force held out until about 15:30 hours, when, low on ammunition and by now reduced to 18 men, they were forced to surrender, 45 minutes before the leading elements of the British 5th Division arrived from the south. Despite these mishaps, the widespread landing of airborne troops, both American and British, had a positive effect as small isolated units, acting on their initiative, attacked vital points and created confusion.

==== Seaborne landings ====
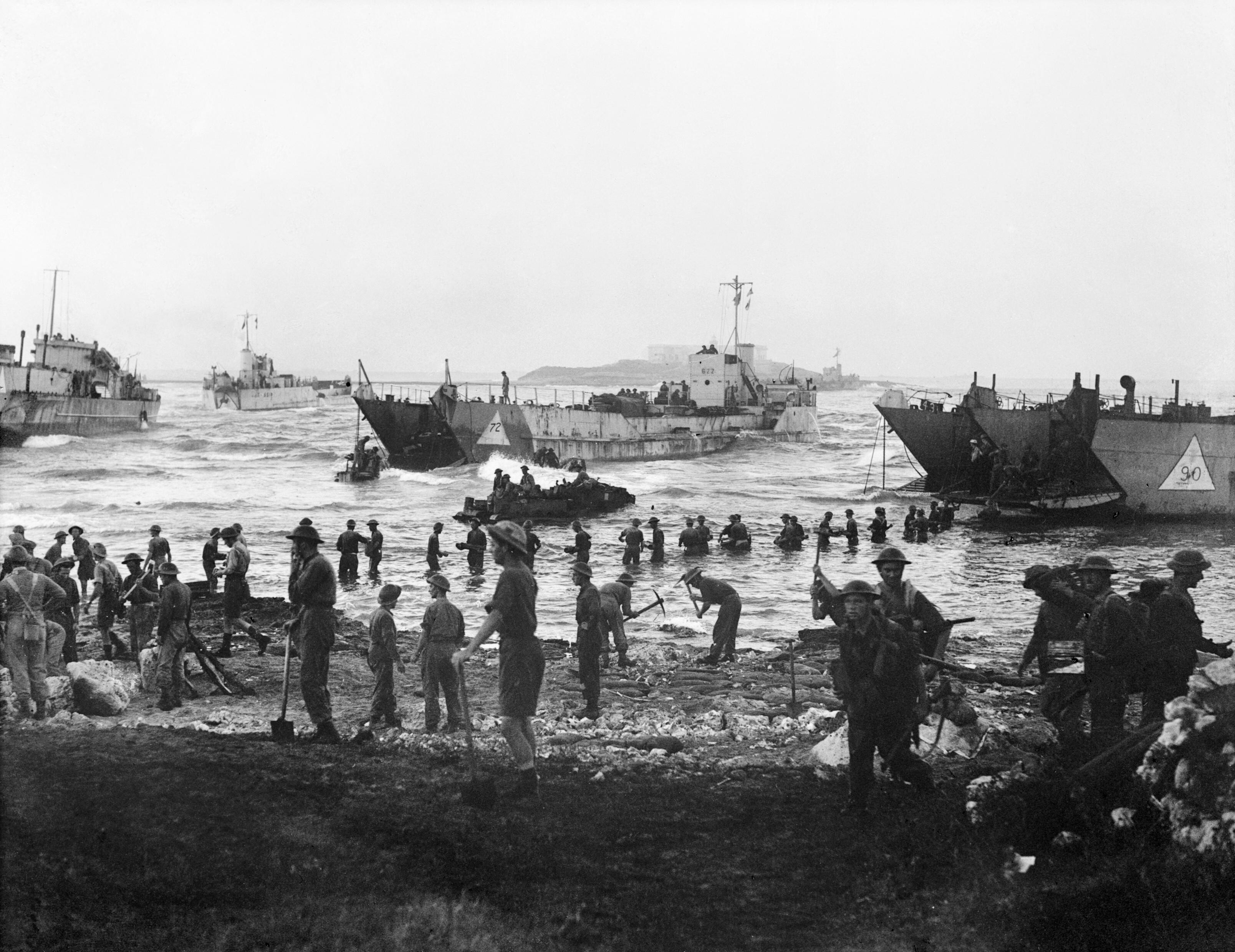
Troops from the 51st (Highland) Division unloading stores from tank landing craft on the opening day of the invasion of Sicily, 10 July 1943

The strong wind which complicated paratrooper operations made matters difficult for the amphibious landings but also ensured surprise as many of the defenders had assumed that no one would attempt a landing in such poor conditions. Landings were made in the early hours of 10 July from 2:45am on 26 main beaches spread along 170 kilometres (105 mi) of the southern and eastern coasts of the island between the town of Licata (where the U.S. 3rd Infantry Division, under the command of Major General Lucian Truscott, landed at Torre di Gaffe, red beach, and Mollarella and Poliscia, green beaches) in the west, and Cassibile in the east. British and Canadian forces landed in the south-east of the island and Americans toward the west. This constituted the largest amphibious operation of World War II in terms of size of the landing zone and the number of divisions put ashore on the first day. Greek destroyers were tasked with covering the landing operations. The Italian defensive plan did not contemplate a pitched battle on the beaches and so the landings themselves were somewhat anticlimactic.

More trouble was experienced from the difficult weather conditions (especially on the southern beaches) and unexpected hidden offshore sandbars than from the coastal divisions. Some troops landed in the wrong place, in the wrong order and as much as six hours behind schedule, but the weakness of the defensive response allowed the Allied force to make up lost time. Nevertheless, several Italian coastal units fought well; the 429th Coastal Battalion (under Major Marco Rubellino), tasked with defending Gela and its beachhead, had lost 45 percent of its men, while the attacking U.S. Army Ranger Battalion lost several men to mines and machine-gun and cannon fire. (Note: "The 429th Coastal Battalion lost 45 percent of its men.") Gruppo Tattico Carmito (under Lieutenant-Colonel Francesco Tropea), tasked with defending Malati Bridge, defeated a Royal Marines Commando Battalion on 13 July with the help of the local middle-age reservists. The Italian 4th Self-Propelled Artillery Battalion attacked the Commandos with the help of the 372nd Coastal Defence Battalion, 553rd (under Captain Giovanni Sartor) and 554th (under Captain Fausto Clementi) Motorcycle Companies, and three Panzer IV medium tanks. The 246th Coastal Battalion (under Major Rollo Franco) defeated British attempts to capture Augusta on the night of 11–12 July. On July 12, the Greek destroyer Kanaris was the one who led the attack on Augusta. It had to temporarily withdraw, but later entered again with a British destroyer and succeeded in taking over the town.

In the U.S. 1st Infantry Division (Major General Terry Allen) sector at Gela, there was an Italian division-sized counterattack where the dispersed 505th Parachute Regimental Combat Team was supposed to have been. Tiger tanks of the Hermann Göring Panzer Division, which had been due to advance with the 4th Infantry Division "Livorno", were late.

On highways 115 and 117 during 10 July, Italian tanks of the "Niscemi" Armoured Combat Group and Livorno Division infantry nearly reached the Allied position at Gela, but gunfire from the destroyer USS Shubrick and the light cruiser USS Boise destroyed several tanks and dispersed the attacking infantry battalion. The 3rd Battalion, 34th Regiment, "Livorno" Infantry Division, composed mainly of conscripts, made a daylight attack on the Gela beachhead two days later, with infantry and armor of the Hermann Göring Panzer Division, but was repulsed.

By the morning of 10 July, the Joint Task Force Operations Support System Force captured the port of Licata, at the cost of nearly 100 killed and wounded in the U.S. 3rd Infantry Division, and the division beat back a counter-attack from the 538th Coastal Defence Battalion. By 11:30, Licata was firmly in American hands and the U.S. 3rd Division had lost fewer than one hundred men. Salvage parties had already partially cleared the harbor, and shortly after noon Truscott and his staff came ashore and set up headquarters at Palazzo La Lumia. About that time, the 538th Coastal Defense Battalion, which had been deployed as a tactical reserve, launched a counter-attack. By the evening of 10 July, the seven Allied assault divisions—three American, three British and one Canadian—were well established ashore, the port of Syracuse had been captured, and fears of an Axis air onslaught had proved unfounded.

The preparatory bombing of the previous weeks had greatly weakened the Axis air capability and the heavy Allied presence of aircraft operating from Malta, Gozo, and Pantelleria kept most of the Axis attempts at air attack at bay. Some attacks on the first day of the invasion got through, and German aircraft sank the landing ship LST-313 and minesweeper USS Sentinel. Italian Stukas sank the destroyer USS Maddox and Re.2002s sunk the Indian hospital ship Talamba with heavy loss of life, (Note: "The only serious casualty was the sinking, with heavy loss of life, of the hospital ship Talamba, which was lying, fully illuminated, five miles off the beaches." Stephen Wentworth Roskill. The War at Sea, 1939–1945: part 1. The offensive, 1st June 1943–31st May 1944. H.M. Stationery Office, 1960. p. 131) and in the following days Axis aircraft damaged or sank several more warships, transport vessels and landing craft starting with the Allied troopship USS Barnett hit and damaged by an Italian bomber formation on the morning of 11 July. Italian Stukas (named Picchiatello in Italian service) and Savoia-Marchetti SM.79 torpedo-bombers coordinated their attacks with German Stuka and Ju 88 bomber units. As part of the seaborne landings south at Agnone, some 400 men of Lieutenant Colonel John Durnford-Slater's No. 3 Commando captured Malati Bridge on 13 July, only to lose possession of it when the 4th Self-Propelled Artillery Battalion (Lieutenant-Colonel Francesco Tropea) and the Italian 553rd and 554th Motorcycle Companies counter-attacked.

=== Exploitation ===
Alexander's plan was to first establish his forces on a line between Licata in the west and Catania in the east before embarking on operations to reduce the rest of the island. Key to this was capturing ports to facilitate the buildup of his forces and the capture of airfields. The task of Montgomery's Eighth Army was, therefore, to capture the Pachino Airfield on Cape Passero and the port of Syracuse before moving northwards to take the ports of Augusta and Catania. Their objectives also included the landing fields around Gerbini, on the Catania plain. The objectives of Patton's Seventh Army included capturing the port of Licata and the airfields of Ponte Olivo, Biscari and Comiso. It was then to prevent the enemy reserves from moving eastward against the Eighth Army's left flank.

According to Axis plans, Kampfgruppe Schmalz (Colonel Wilhelm Schmalz), in conjunction with the 54th Infantry Division "Napoli" (Major-General Giulio Cesare Gotti Porcinari), was to counter-attack an Allied landing on the Augusta–Syracuse coast. On 10 July, Schmalz had been unable to contact the Italian division and had proceeded alone towards Syracuse. Unknown to Schmalz, a battalion of 18 Renault R35 tanks (under Lieutenant-Colonel Massimo D'Andretta) and supporting infantry battalion from the 75th Infantry Regiment (under Colonel Paolo Giovanni Ronco) of the Napoli Division, broke through the forward positions held by the 2nd Battalion, Wiltshire Regiment, part of the 13th Brigade the British 5th Division, and were stopped only by anti-tank and artillery fire in the Priolo and Floridia suburbs of Syracuse.

On the night of 11–12 July, the Royal Navy attempted to capture Augusta but the 246th Coastal Battalion repelled the British landing force that was supported by three destroyers. On 12 July, several Italian units took up rearguard positions and covered the withdrawal of Kampfgruppe Schmalz and the Hermann Göring Division. The American advance toward Canicattì was temporarily held up by Semovente da 90/53 tank destroyers from the 161st Self-propelled Artillery Battalion, 526th Bersaglieri Battalion and 177th Bersaglieri Regiment from Gruppo Tattico Venturi (under General Enrico Francisci, killed in action and posthumously awarded the Gold Medal of Military Valour), as Kampfgruppe Schmalz retreated toward Catania. The 246th Coastal Battalion retreated to strong points at Cozzo Telegrafo and Acquedolci. The 76th Infantry Regiment of the Napoli Division covered the left flank of Kampfgruppe Schmalz which withdrew toward Lentini and then retired to Palermo. The Hermann Göring Division eventually pulled back from the Piano Lupo area toward Caltagirone and the Livorno Division withdrew its right flank toward Piazza Armerina, to cover the Hermann Göring Division.

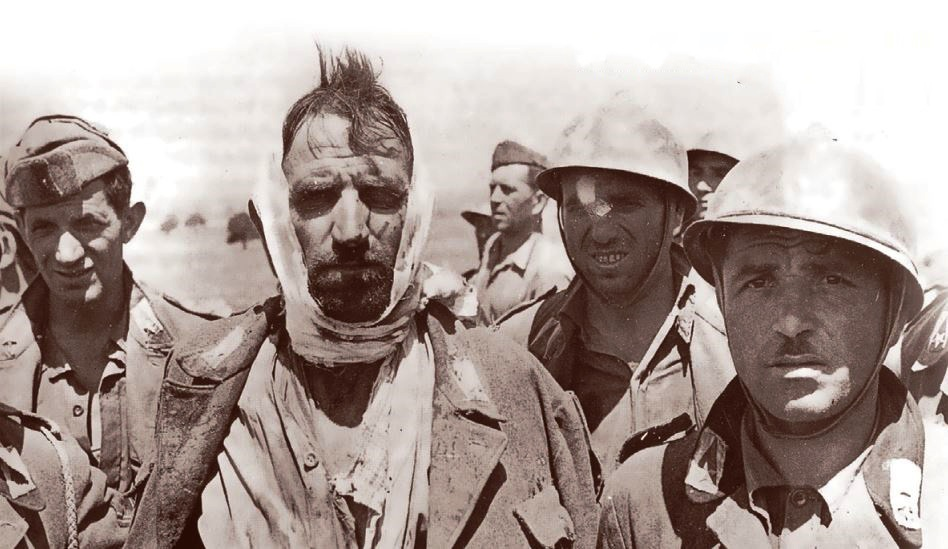
Italian soldiers of the 206th Coastal Division, taken prisoner by British forces. Typical of the second-rate equipment issued to the Coastal divisions, they are wearing Adrian helmets of World War I vintage, rather than the more modern M 33.

Early on 13 July, elements of the British 5th Division on Eighth Army's right flank, which had been delayed by Kampfgruppe Schmalz, entered Augusta. On their left, British 50th Division had pushed up Route 114 toward Lentini, 25 kilometres (15 mi) northwest of Augusta and met increasing resistance from the Napoli Division. The commander of the Italian division and his staff were captured by the British 4th Armoured Brigade on 13 July and it was not until 18:45 on 14 July that the town was cleared of obstructions and snipers and the advance resumed. A battalion of the Napoli Division managed to break through the British lines and took up new positions at Augusta but the British advance forced it to retire again on 14 July.

Further left, in the XXX Corps sector, the 51st (Highland) Division had moved directly north to take Palazzolo and Vizzini 50 kilometres (30 mi) west of Syracuse, while the Canadians secured Pachino airfield and headed north-west to make contact with the American right wing at Ragusa; after having driven off the Italian 122 Infantry Regiment north of Pachino. The Canadians captured more than 500 Italians. In the Canadian area, the 2nd Special Service Brigade, under Brigadier Robert Laycock, was counter-attacked by the 206th Coastal Division (under General Achille d'Havet) who launched a strong counter-attack that threatened to penetrate the area between the Canadians and the Royal Marine Commandos before being repulsed.

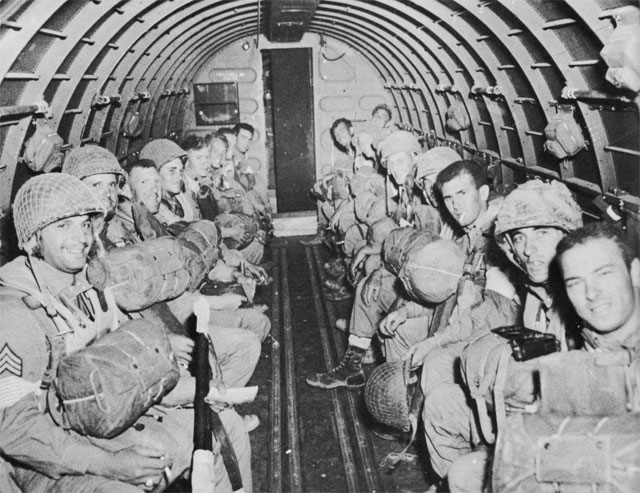
American paratroopers of the 504th PIR bound for Sicily, July 1943

In the American sector, by the morning of 10 July, the port of Licata had been captured. On 11 July, Patton ordered his reserve parachute troops from the 504th Parachute Infantry Regiment (minus the 3rd Battalion already deployed in Sicily, attached to the 505th) under Colonel Reuben Tucker, part of 82nd Airborne Division, to drop and reinforce the center. In addition, going along with the 504th would be the 376th Parachute Field Artillery Battalion, Company 'C' of the 307th Airborne Engineer Battalion and other supporting units. Warning orders had been issued to the fleet and troops on 6, 7, 10 and 11 July concerning the planned route and timing of the drop, so that the aircraft would not be fired on by friendly forces. They were intended to drop east of Ponte Olivo, about eight kilometres (5 mi) inland from Gela, to block routes to the 1st Infantry Division's bridgehead at Gela.

The 144 Douglas C-47 transports arrived at the same time as an Axis air raid; the first echelon of troop carrying planes had dropped their loads without interference, when an Allied naval vessel fired on the formation. Immediately, all the other naval vessels and shore troops joined in, shooting down friendly aircraft and forcing paratroopers to jump far from their drop zones. The 52nd Troop Carrier Wing lost 23 of 144 С-47s to friendly fire; there were 318 casualties with 83 dead. Thirty-seven aircraft were damaged, while eight returned to base without dropping their parachutists. The paratroopers suffered 229 casualties to "friendly fire", including 81 dead. Among the casualties was Brigadier General Charles L. Keerans, Jr., the 82nd Airborne's assistant division commander (ADC), who was along with the 504th as an unofficial observer. The 325th Glider Infantry Regiment, part of the 82nd Airborne Division and commanded by Colonel Harry L. Lewis, was then waiting in North Africa and scheduled to land in Sicily by glider that night, together with the rest of the division staff. After what happened to the 504th, Ridgway canceled the operation.

Despite this, the American beach landings went well and a substantial amount of supplies and transport was landed. Despite the failure of the airborne operation, the 1st Infantry Division took Ponte Olivo on 12 July and continued north, while 45th Infantry Division on the right had taken the airfield at Comiso and entered Ragusa to link-up with the Canadians. On the left, the 3rd Infantry Division, having landed at Licata, pushed troops 40 kilometres (25 mi) up the coast almost to Argento and 30 kilometres (20 mi) inland to Canicatti.

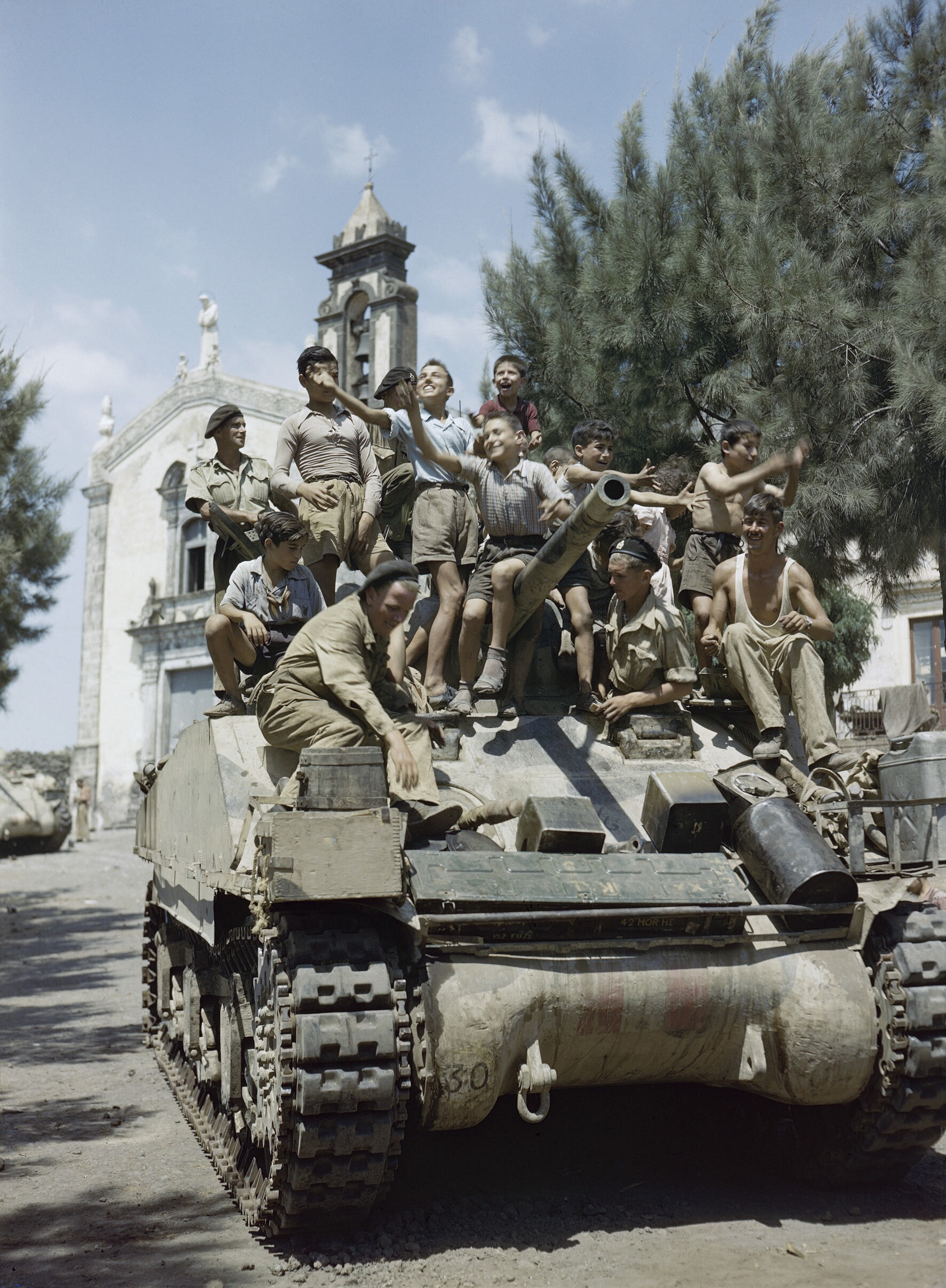
Sherman tank of the 3rd County of London Yeomanry (Sharpshooters) in the village of Belpasso near Catania, Sicily, August 1943

Once the beachheads were secure, Alexander planned to split the island in half by thrusting north through the Caltanissetta and Enna region, to deny the defenders the central east–west lateral road. A further push north to Nicosia would cut the next lateral route and a final advance to Santo Stefano on the north coast would cut the coastal route. In new orders issued on 13 July, he gave this task to Eighth Army, perhaps based on a somewhat over-optimistic situation report by Montgomery late on 12 July, while the Seventh Army were to continue their holding role on the left flank of the Eighth Army, despite what appeared to be an opportunity for them to make a bold offensive move. On 12 July, Kesselring had visited Sicily and formed the opinion that German troops were fighting virtually on their own. As a consequence, he concluded that the German formations needed to be reinforced, and that western Sicily should be abandoned in order to shorten the front line. The priority was first to slow and then halt the Allied advance, while a Hauptkampflinie was formed running from San Stefano on the northern coast, through Nicosia and Agira to Cantenanuova and from there to the eastern coast south of Catania.

While XIII Corps continued to push along the Catania road, XXX Corps were directed north along two routes; the first was an inland route through Vizzini, and the second following Route 124, which cut across the U.S. 45th Infantry Division, which had to return to the coast at Gela for redeployment behind the U.S. 1st Infantry Division. Progress was slow as Kampfgruppe Schmalz skilfully delayed the British 5th Infantry Division, allowing time for two regiments from the German 1st Parachute Division flying to Catania to deploy. On 12 July, the British 1st Parachute Brigade, commanded by Brigadier Gerald Lathbury, had been dropped in Operation Fustian, an attempt to capture the Primosole Bridge over the river Simeto, on the southern edge of the Catania plain. The British paratroopers suffered heavy casualties over their designated drop zones due to heavy fire from alert Italian anti-aircraft gunners, but managed to seize and hold the bridge against fierce Axis attacks. The initial counterattacks were Italian in the form of reinforcements from the 10th Arditi Paratroop Regiment (Major Vito Marciano), reservists from the 372nd Coastal Battalion and gunners from the 29th Artillery Group fighting in the infantry role and an armoured car squadron that nearly overran the headquarters of 9th Battalion, the Durham Light Infantry, at nightfall in the first day of the battle for Primosole Bridge. (Note: "Both the 8th and 9th Battalions tried to snatch a few hours rest during the night. The 6th Battalion was still some way behind, after clearing up at Solarino, and did not arrive till later on the 15th. But at 4 a.m. the 9th Battalion was attacked by some Italian armoured cars which penetrated as far as Battalion Headquarters before being halted.") The British 5th Division was delayed by strong opposition, but made contact early on 15 July; nevertheless, it was not until 17 July that a shallow bridgehead north of the river was consolidated.

On 16 July, the surviving Italian aircraft withdrew to the mainland. About 160 Italian planes had been lost in the first week of the invasion, 57 lost to Allied fighters and anti-aircraft fire on 10–12 July alone. That day, an Italian bomber torpedoed the aircraft carrier HMS Indomitable, and the Italian submarine Dandolo torpedoed the cruiser HMS Cleopatra. Both ships were put out of action for over a year.

On the night of 17 July, the Italian cruiser Scipione Africano, equipped with EC.3 Gufo radar, detected and engaged four British Elco motor torpedo boats lurking eight kilometres (5 mi) away, while passing the Strait of Messina at high speed. MTB 316 was sunk and MTB 313 damaged between Reggio di Calabria and Pellaro–twelve British sailors were killed.

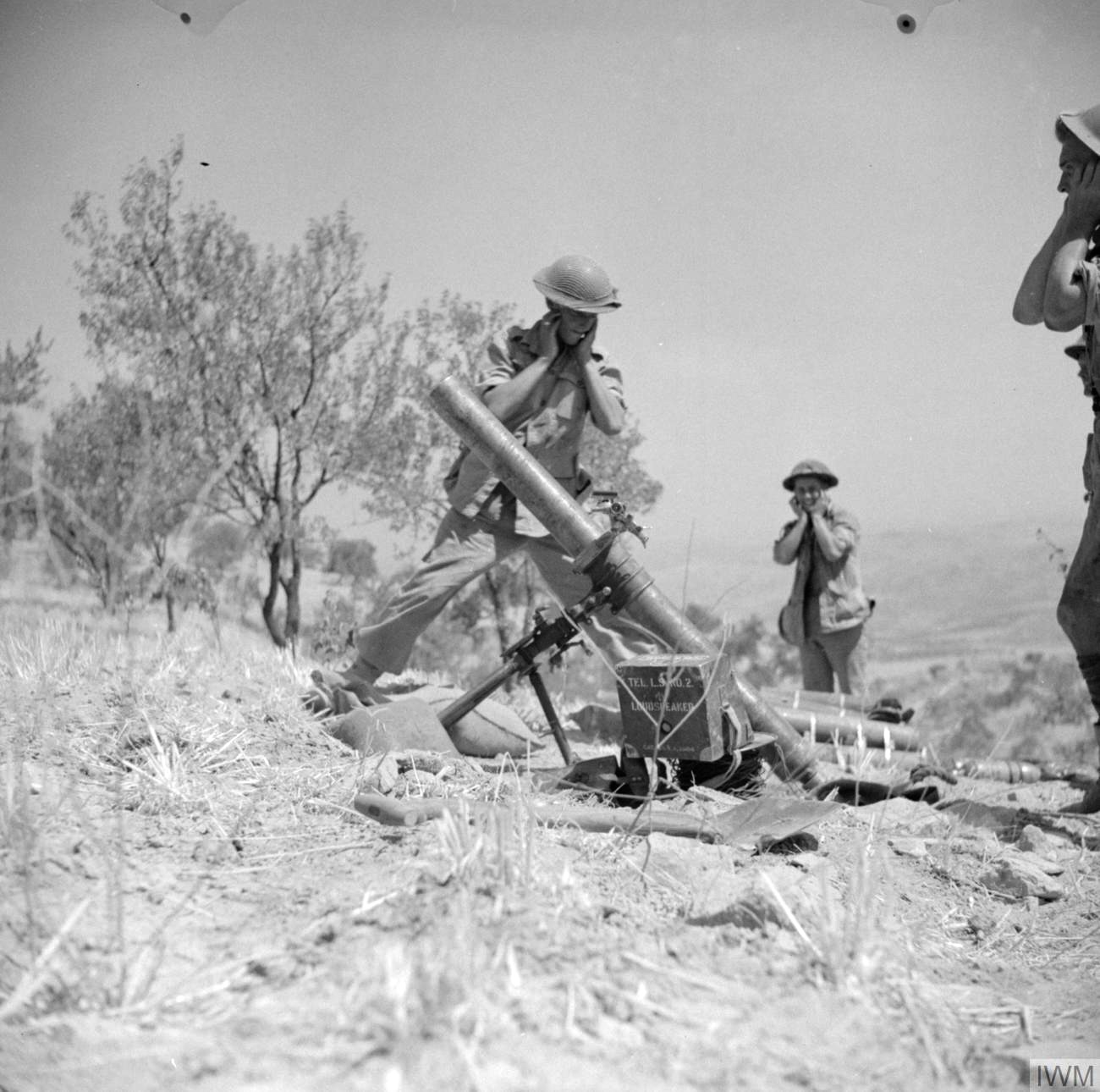
4.2-inch mortar of the 1st Battalion, Princess Louise's Kensington Regiment, British 78th Infantry Division, in action near Adrano, 6 August 1943

On the night of 17–18 July, Montgomery renewed his attack toward Catania, with two brigades of the 50th Division. They met strong opposition and by 19 July Montgomery decided to call off the attack and instead increase the pressure on his left. The 5th Division attacked on the 50th Division's left but with no greater success, and on 20 July, the 51st Division, further west, crossed the river Dittaino at Sferro and made for the Gerbini airfields. They too were driven back by counter-attacks on 21 July. On the left flank, the 1st Canadian Division continued to advance but it was becoming clear that, as German units settled into their new positions in north eastern Sicily, the army would not have sufficient strength to carry the whole front and the Canadians were ordered to continue north to Leonforte and then turn eastward to Adrano on the south-western slopes of Mount Etna, instead of an encirclement of Mount Etna using Route 120 to Randazzo. Montgomery called forward his reserve division from North Africa, the British 78th Infantry Division.

Patton had reorganised his forces into two corps. The Provisional Corps, commanded by Keyes, consisting of the 2nd Armored, 3rd Infantry, and 82nd Airborne Divisions, was on the left. The U.S. II Corps was on the right. By 17 July, Provisional Corps had captured Porto Empedocle and Agrigento. On 18 July, II Corps took Caltanissetta, just short of Route 121, the main east–west lateral through the center of Sicily. The American advance toward Agrigento was temporarily held up by the 207th Coastal Defence Division (under Colonel Augusto De Laurentis) that was at Sant'Oliva Station, ten kilometres (6 mi) inland from Licata. The 10th Bersaglieri Regiment forced the 1st and 3rd Ranger Battalions of the 3rd Infantry Division to fight their way into Agrigento. By late afternoon on 16 July, the city was in American hands.

The 15th Panzer Grenadier Division managed to join the other German formations in the east of the island. Patton was ordered on 18 July to push troops north through Petralia on Route 120, the next east–west lateral, and then to cut the northern coast road. After that, he would mop up the west of the island. II Corps were given the task of making the northward move, while the Provisional Corps was tasked with the mopping up operation. Alexander issued further orders to Patton to develop an eastward threat along the coast road once he had cut it. He was also directed to capture Palermo as quickly as possible as the main supply base for further eastward commitment north of Mount Etna. On 21 July, the Seventh Army's Provisional Corps overran the Italian battlegroup Raggruppamento Schreiber (under General Ottorino Schreiber), covering the withdrawal of the 15th Panzer Panzergrenadier Division, but Patton lost 300 men killed and wounded in the process. On 22 July, the Provisional Corps entered Palermo, and the next day the 45th Division cut the north coast road.

=== Battles for Etna positions ===
During the last week in July, Montgomery gathered his forces to renew the attack on 1 August. His immediate objective was Adrano, the capture of which would split the German forces on either side of Mount Etna. During the week, the Canadians and the 231st Brigade Group continued their eastward push from Leonforte, and on 29 July had taken Agira, some 25 kilometres (15 mi) west of Adrano. On the night of 29 July, the British 78th Division with the 3rd Canadian Brigade under command, took Catenuova and made a bridgehead across the river Dittaino. On the night of 1 August, they resumed their attack to the northwest toward Centuripe, an isolated pinnacle of rock, which was the main southern outpost of the Adrano defences. After heavy fighting against the Hermann Göring Division and the 3rd Parachute Regiment all day on 2 August, the town was finally cleared of defenders on the morning of 3 August. The capture of Centuripe proved critical, in that the growing threat to Adrano made the position covering Catania untenable.

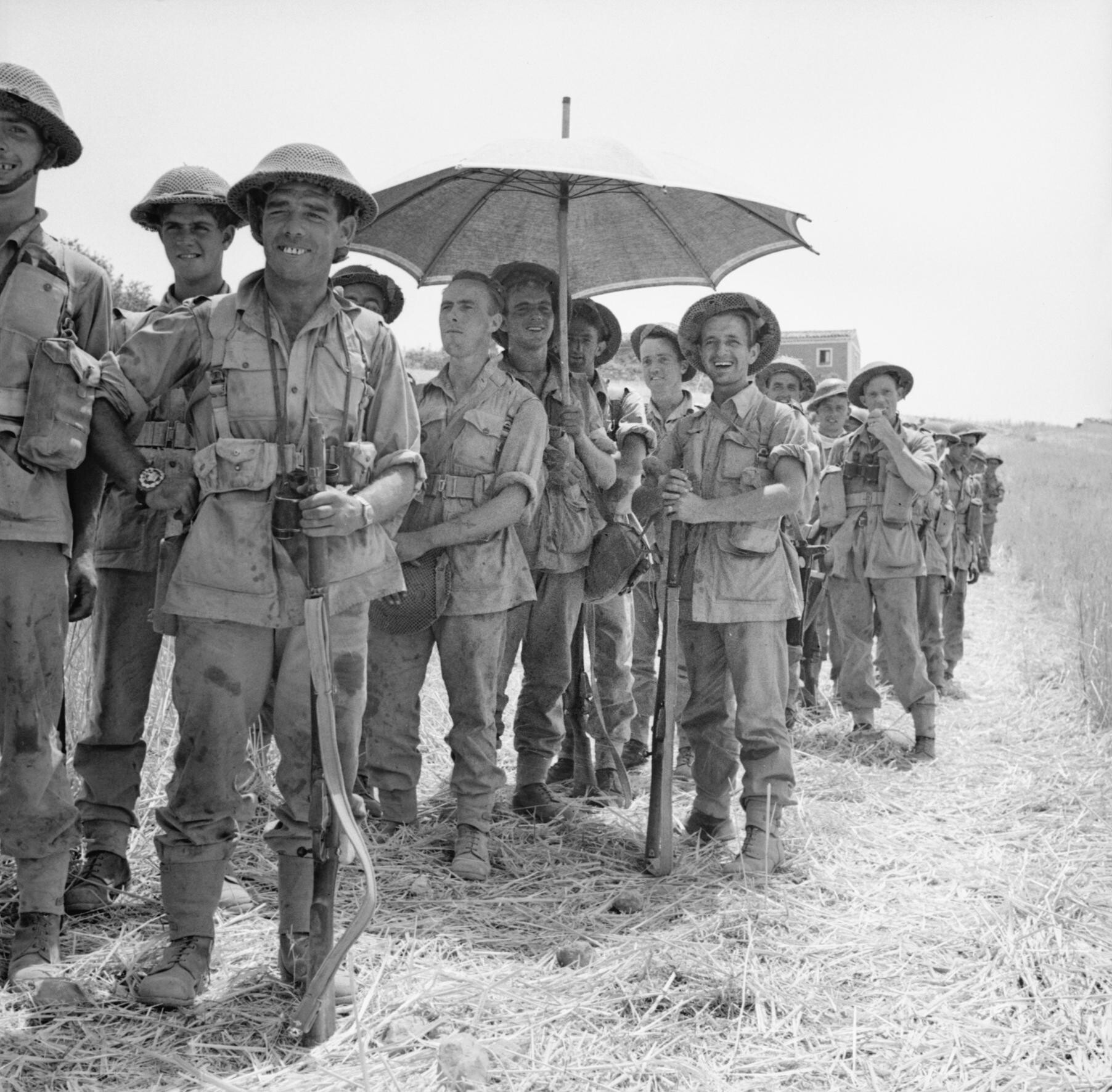
Men of the 6th Battalion, Royal Inniskilling Fusiliers, British 78th Division, await orders to move into Centuripe, Sicily, 2 August 1943.

Patton had decided that his communications could support two divisions pushing east, the 45th Division on the coast road and the 1st Division on Route 120. In order to maintain the pressure, he relieved the 45th Division with the fresher 3rd Division and called up the 9th Infantry Division from reserve in North Africa to relieve the 1st Division. Axis forces were now settled on a second defensive line, the Etna Line, running from San Fratello on the north coast through Troina and Aderno. On 31 July, the 1st Division with elements of the arriving 9th Division attached, reached Troina and the Battle of Troina commenced. This important position was held by the 15th Panzer Grenadier Division. The remnants of the 28th Infantry Division "Aosta" in the form of four battalions had also been pulled back to Troina to assist in the defensive preparations and forthcoming battle.

For six days, the Germans and Italians conducted a costly defence; during the battle, they launched 24 counter-attacks and many small local ones. By 7 August, the U.S. 18th Infantry Regiment, of the 9th Division, had captured Mount Pellegrino, which overlooked the Troina defences, allowing accurate direction of Allied artillery. The defenders' left flank was also becoming exposed as the adjacent Hermann Göring Division was pushed back by the British XXX Corps and they were ordered to withdraw that night in phases to the defensive positions of the Tortorici Line. Elements of the 29th Panzergrenadier Division and 26th Infantry Division "Assietta" were also proving difficult to dislodge on the coast at Santa Agata and San Fratello. Patton sent a small amphibious force behind the defences, which led to the fall of Santa Agata on 8 August after holding out for six days.

On 3 August, XIII Corps exploited the disorganisation caused by the threat to Adrano and resumed their advance on Catania, and by 5 August the town was in their hands. Adrano fell to the 78th Division on the night of 6 August, while on the right, the 51st (Highland) Division took Biancavilla, three kilometres (2 mi) southeast of Adrano. After the fall of Adrano, the 1st Canadian Division was withdrawn into Army Reserve. On 8 August, the 78th Division, moving north from Adrano, took Bronte, and the 9th Division, advancing from Troina, took Cesaro, valuable positions on the New Hube Line. Both divisions converged on Randazzo, on the north-west slopes of Etna. Randazzo fell on 13 August and 78th Division was taken into reserve. As the Allied advance continued, the front line shortened. On 10 August, Montgomery decided to withdraw XIII Corps HQ and the British 5th Infantry Division, now commanded by Major General Gerard Bucknall (replacing Major General Berney-Ficklin, who returned to England), to allow them to prepare for the landings on mainland Italy. On the northern coast, the U.S. 3rd Division continued to meet strong resistance and difficulties created by extensive demolition of the road. Two more end-run amphibious attacks, and the rebuilding efforts of the engineers, kept the advance moving. Although Kesselring had already decided to evacuate, the Axis forces continued their delaying tactics, assisted by the favorable defensive terrain of the Messina Peninsula. Finally, on the night of 16 August, the leading elements of 3rd Division entered Messina.

=== Axis evacuation ===
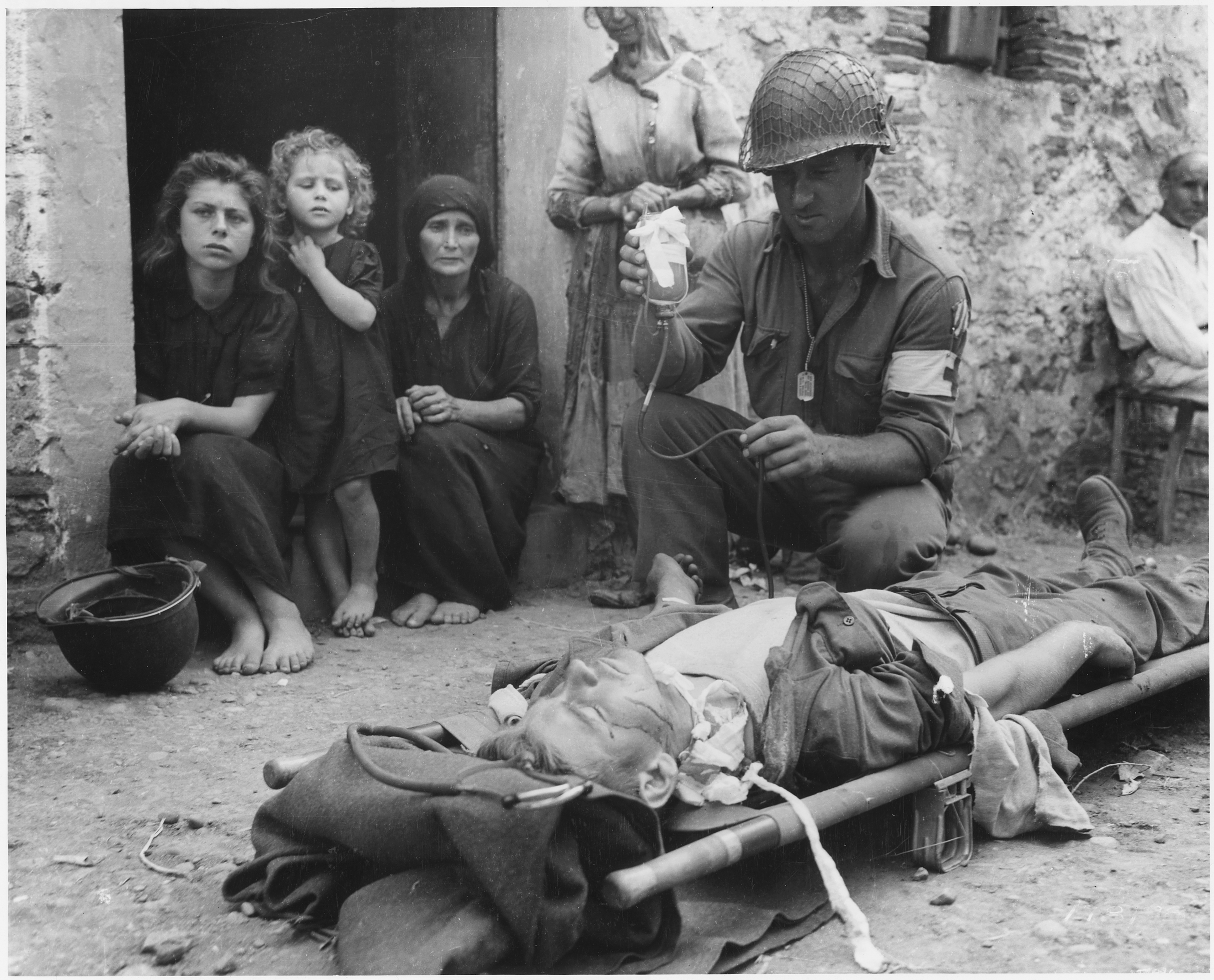
Pfc. Harvey White gives blood plasma to Pvt. Roy W. Humphrey of the 7th Inf. Regt., US 3rd Division at the aid station, Sant'Agata, after he was wounded by shrapnel on the 9th August 1943.

By 27 July, the Axis commanders had realised that the outcome of the campaign would be an evacuation from Messina. Kesselring reported to Hitler on 29 July that an evacuation could be accomplished in three days and initial written plans were formulated dated 1 August. However, when Hube suggested on 4 August that a start should be made by transferring superfluous men and equipment, Guzzoni refused to sanction the idea without the approval of the Comando Supremo. The Germans nevertheless went ahead, transferring over 12,000 men, 4,500 vehicles and 5,000 tons of equipment from 1–10 August. On 6 August, Hube suggested to Guzzoni, via von Senger, that HQ 6th Army should move to Calabria. Guzzoni rejected the idea but asked if Hube had decided to evacuate Sicily. Von Senger replied that Hube had not.

The next day, Guzzoni learned of the German plan for evacuation and reported to Rome of his conviction of their intentions. On 7 August, Guzzoni reported that, without German support, any last ditch stand would only be short. On 9 August, Rome ordered that Guzzoni's authority should be extended to Calabria and that he should transfer some forces there to reinforce the area. On 10 August, Guzzoni informed Hube that he was responsible for the defence of northeast Sicily and that Italian coastal units and the Messina garrison were under his command. Guzzoni then crossed to the mainland with 6th Army HQ and 16th Corps HQ, leaving Admiral Pietro Barone and Admiral Pietro Parenti to organise the evacuation of the remains of the Livorno and Assietta divisions (and any other troops and equipment that could be saved).

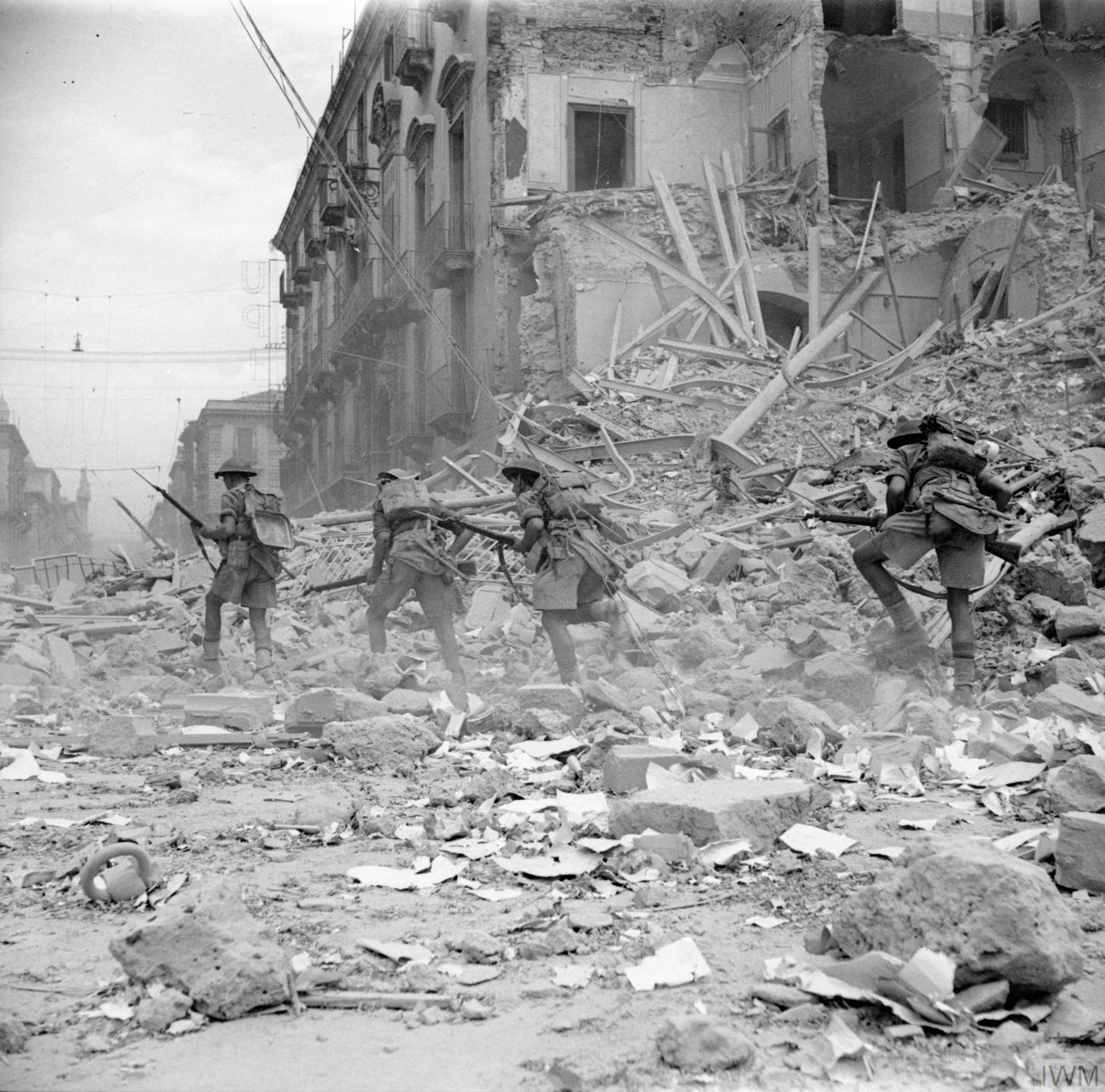
British troops scramble over rubble in a devastated street in Catania, Sicily, 5 August 1943.

The German plan was thorough, with clear lines of command imposing strict discipline on the operation. Oberst Ernst-Günther Baade was the German Commandant Messina Straits, with Fortress Commander powers, including control over infantry, artillery, anti-aircraft, engineer and construction, transport and administration units as well as German naval transport headquarters. On the mainland, Generalmajor Richard Heidrich, who had remained in Calabria with the 1st Parachute Division headquarters and the 1st Parachute Regiment, when the rest of the division had been sent as reinforcements to Sicily, was appointed XIV Panzer Corps Mainland Commander to receive evacuating formations, while Hube continued to control the operations on the island.

Full-scale withdrawal, codenamed Operation Lehrgang, began on 11 August and continued to 17 August. During this period, Hube ordered successive withdrawals each night of between 8 and 24 kilometres (5 and 15 mi), keeping the following Allied units at arm's length with the use of mines, demolitions and other obstacles. As the peninsula narrowed, shortening his front, he was able to withdraw units for evacuation. The Allies attempted to counter this by launching brigade-sized amphibious assaults, one each by the Seventh and Eighth Armies, on 15 August. However, the Axis withdrawal was so swift that these operations "hit air".

An Eighth Army soldier enjoys being fed grapes by a local girl in Sicily, August 1943

The German and Italian evacuation schemes proved highly successful. The Allies were not able to prevent the orderly withdrawal nor effectively interfere with transports across the Strait of Messina. The narrow straits were protected by 120 heavy and 112 light anti-aircraft guns, about half of which were Italian-built pieces. (Note: "Lining either side of the Messina Straits were some 150 Italian antiaircraft guns, and an estimated 168 of the Germans' feared 88mm flak guns." Bryn Evans. The Decisive Campaigns of the Desert Air Force, 1942–1945. Pen & Sword, 2014) The resulting overlapping gunfire from both sides of the strait was described by Allied pilots as worse than the Ruhr, making daylight air attacks highly hazardous and generally unsuccessful. Night attacks were less hazardous and there were times when air attack was able to delay and even suspend traffic across the straits but when daylight returned, the Axis were able to clear the backlog from the previous night. Nor was naval interdiction any more practicable. The straits varied from three to ten kilometres (2–6 mi) wide and were covered by artillery up to 24 centimeters (9 1/2 in) in caliber. This, combined with the hazards of a six-knot (3 m/s) current and fear that Italian warships were preparing to attack the Straits of Messina in a suicide run, made risking warships unjustifiable.

== Aftermath ==
On 18 August, the Oberkommando der Wehrmacht recorded that 60,000 troops had been recovered and the Italian figure was about 75,000. In 2004, Tomblin wrote that the Italians evacuated 62,182 men, 41 guns and 227 vehicles with the loss of only one motor raft and the train ferry Cariddi, which was scuttled when Allied troops entered Messina. The Germans evacuated some 52,000 troops (including 4,444 wounded), 14,105 vehicles, 47 tanks, 94 guns, 1,100 tons of ammunition, and about 20,700 tons of gear and stores.

=== Casualties ===
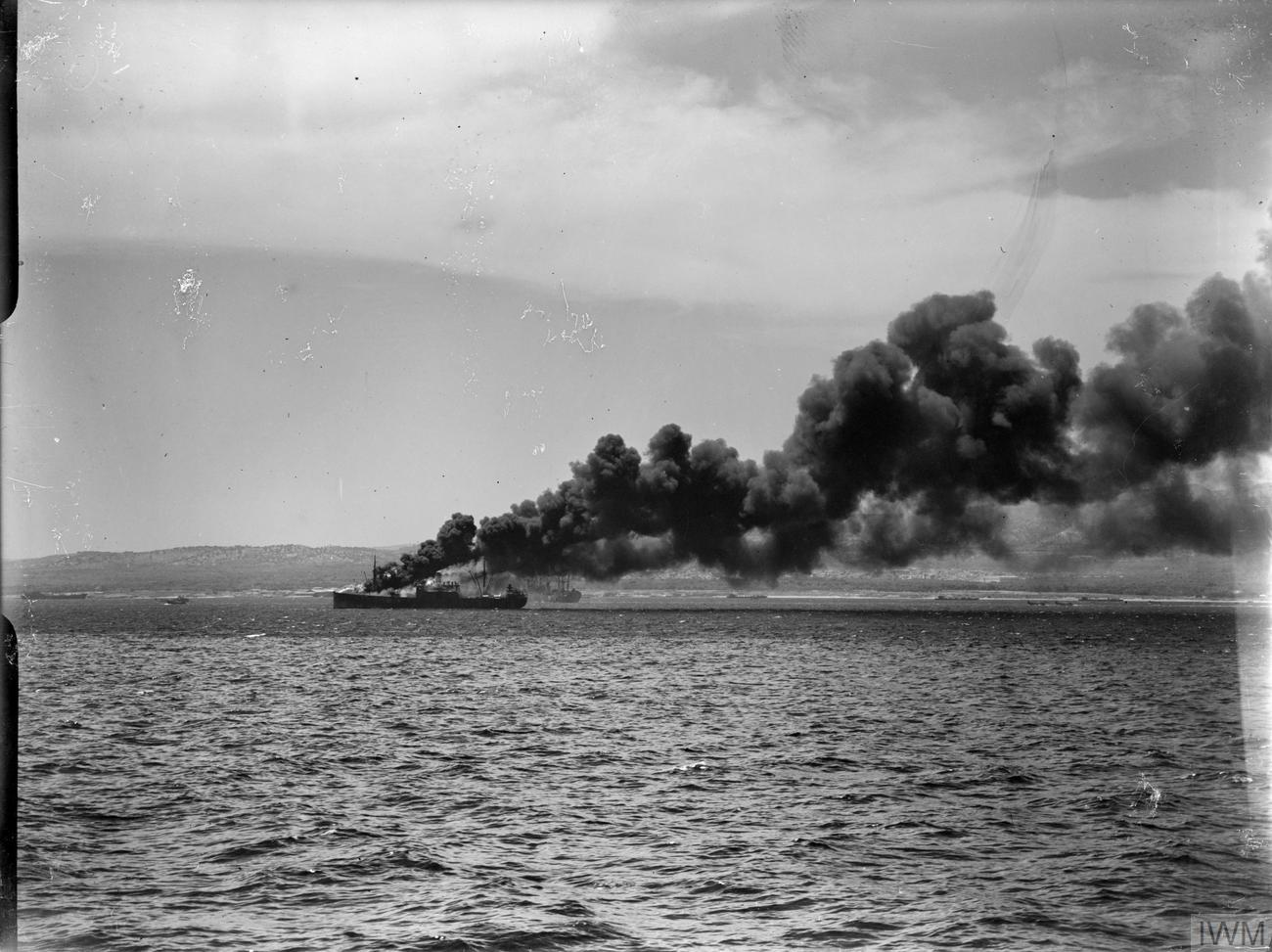
A Royal Navy ammunition ship, hit by bombs, burns during the initial landings.

The U.S. Seventh Army lost 8,781 men (2,237 killed or missing, 5,946 wounded, and 598 captured), while the British Eighth Army suffered 11,843 casualties (2,062 killed or missing, 7,137 wounded and 2,644 captured). The U.S. Navy lost 546 killed or missing and 484 wounded and the Royal Navy lost 314 killed or missing, 411 wounded and four captured. The USAAF reported 28 killed, 88 missing and 41 wounded. Canadian forces had suffered 2,310 casualties, including 562 killed, 1,664 wounded, and 84 captured.

In 2007, Samuel W. Mitcham and Friederich von Stauffenberg wrote that German units lost about 20,000 men who were either killed, wounded or captured, and in Germany and the Second World War (2007) Messerschmidt et al. reported that the German forces lost 4,325 men killed, 4,583 missing, 5,532 captured and 13,500 wounded, a total of 27,940 casualties. According to the Historical Branch of the Italian Army, Italian military losses were 4,678 killed, 36,072 missing, 32,500 wounded and 116,681 captured. A large part of the missing were presumed to have been killed and buried on the battlefield or in unknown locations, whereas another part presumably included locally recruited soldiers who deserted and returned to their homes. In 2007, Mitcham and Von Stauffenberg estimated Italian total casualties as 147,000. An earlier Canadian study of the Allied invasion estimated the total number of Italian and Germans taken prisoner in Sicily to be around 100,000.

=== War crimes ===
Immediately after Allied landings, a number of instances where American troops killed civilians were reported. These included a massacre at Vittoria, where 12 civilians were killed, including the podestà of Acate, another at Agrigento, and the Canicattì massacre, in which Lieutenant-Colonel George Herbert McCaffrey fired into a civilian crowd looting a factory in Canicattì which refused to disperse, killing eight. During and after the invasion, Allied troops committed a number of rapes and other forms of sexual assaults against civilians in Sicily; Italian statistics report rapes committed by American and Free French forces. According to historian Clive Emsley, the record books of the British Special Investigation Branch recorded "a few" instances of rape and sexual harassment involving British servicemen during the invasion. On 19 July, just over a week after the Allied landings, Captain Angelo Thomas Sesia, a Canadian Army officer in the 1st Canadian Division, recorded that fellow Canadian troops were involved in a number of "unsettling incidents", including looting, shooting at civilians and one gang rape in Piazza Armerina. According to Mitcham and von Stauffenberg, Canadian troops of the Loyal Edmonton Regiment summarily executed German prisoners of war during the invasion.

On 14 July, American troops of the 180th Infantry Regiment summarily executed 73 Axis prisoners of war in the Biscari massacre. After capturing 45 Italian and 3 German POWs while attacking an airfield near Santo Pietro, a regimental detachment led by Sergeant Horace T. West marched the POWs for approximately a mile before West directed that "eight or nine" be separated from the rest and taken to the regiment's intelligence officer for questioning; West summarily executed the remaining 37 POWs. On the next day, the 37 bodies were spotted by an American military chaplain, Lieutenant-Colonel William E. King. King reported the incident to his superiors, who at first dismissed it due to the bad press which would occur if it were made public; after some convincing, they agreed to court-martial West. Troops from the 180th Infantry Regiment committed another massacre on 14 July, when Captain John T. Compton ordered 35 Italian POWs to be summarily executed by firing squad. West and Compton were charged by the United States Army with committing a war crime; West was convicted and sentenced to life in prison and stripped of his rank but was released back to active service in November 1944 as a private and honorably discharged at the end of his service. Compton was charged with killing 40 prisoners in his charge but was acquitted and transferred to another regiment, where he died in November 1943 during the Italian campaign.

== Constituent operations ==
- Operation Barclay/Operation Mincemeat: Deception operations aimed at misleading Axis forces as to the actual date and location of the Allied landings.
- Operation Corkscrew: Allied invasion of the Italian island Pantelleria on 10 June 1943.
- Operation Ladbroke: Glider landing at Syracuse on 9 July 1943.
- Operation Narcissus: Commando raid on a lighthouse near the main landings on 10 July 1943.
- Operation Chestnut: Advanced air drop by 2 SAS to disrupt communications on 12 July 1943.
- Operation Fustian: Airborne landing at Primosole Bridge ahead on 13–14 July 1943.

== See also ==
- Allied Military Government of Occupied Territories
- List of British military equipment of World War II
- List of equipment of the United States Army during World War II
- List of Italian Army equipment in World War II
- List of German military equipment of World War II
- Military history of Italy during World War II
- Operation Overlord
- Operation Downfall
