= Operation Chestnut =

Failed British raid in World War II

- Part of World War II, Invasion of Sicily
Date	12 July 1943
Location	Sicily
Result	British failure

Belligerents
United Kingdom	Italy

Commanders and leaders
Major Geoffrey Appleyard	

Strength
20	

During World War II, Operation Chestnut was a failed British raid by 2 Special Air Service, conducted in support of the Allied invasion of Sicily.

== Background ==
Two teams of ten men each, codenamed 'Pink' and 'Brig', parachuted into northern Sicily on the night of 12 July 1943, to disrupt communications, transport and the enemy in general. All radios were broken and much ammunition, explosives, and food were lost in the jump. One team landed near an inhabited area, alerting the defenders.

Without radios, neither team was able to contact and direct the planes bringing in reinforcements, which subsequently returned to base without any drops being made. The raiders were unable to achieve anything worthwhile and worked their way towards friendly lines evading the enemy.

This was the first parachute raid for 2 SAS, and also the raid when Maj. Geoffrey Appleyard, (former commander of the Small Scale Raiding Force), was lost. Appleyard was aboard the plane carrying 'Pink' team as drop supervisor. After the drop was made the plane failed to return to base.
