= Operation Narcissus =

1943 British raid in Sicily during WWII

During World War II, Operation Narcissus was a raid by forty members of the Special Air Service on a lighthouse on the southeast coast of Sicily. The team landed on 10 July 1943 with the mission of capturing the lighthouse and the surrounding high ground.

Despite intelligence reports, the area was deserted, and so the position was no threat to the nearby Operation Husky landings. The troopers withdrew without a shot being fired.
