= Biscari massacre =

World War II war crime in Sicily

Coordinates: 37.08415°N 14.5153°E

Biscari Massacre
- Location: Biscari airfield, Santo Pietro, Sicily, Italy
- Date: 14 July 1943
- Attack type: Massacre
- Deaths: 73 Axis prisoners of war (71 Italian, 2 German)
- Perpetrators: Horace Theodore West (1st incident); Troops of U.S. 180th Infantry Regiment (2nd incident): John T. Compton

The Biscari massacre was a war crime committed by members of the United States Army during World War II. It refers to two incidents in which U.S. soldiers were involved in killing 71 unarmed Italian and 2 German prisoners-of-war at the Regia Aeronautica's 504 air base in Santo Pietro, a small village near Caltagirone, southern Sicily, Italy, on 14 July 1943.

== Background ==
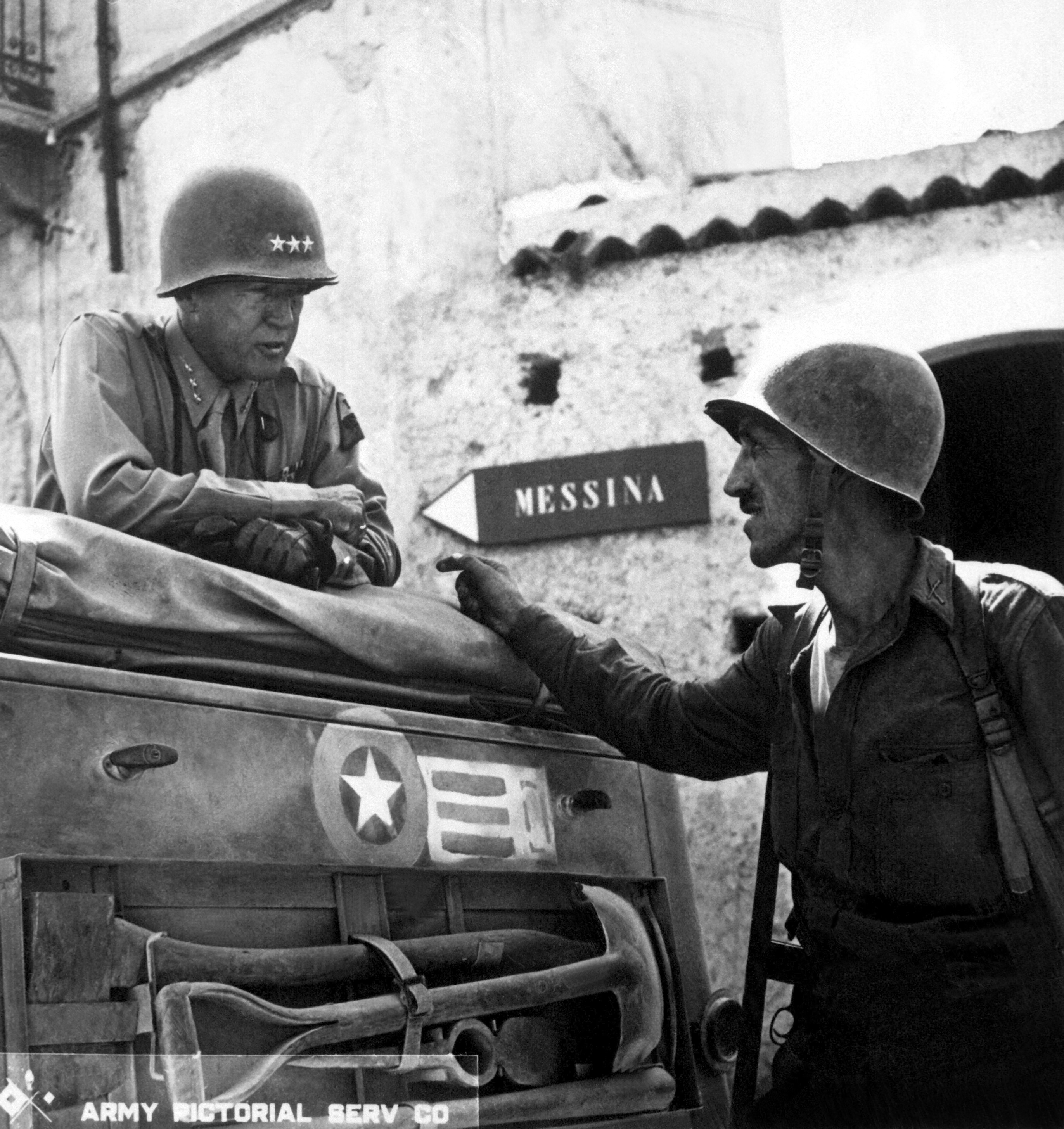
Patton with Lt. Col. Lyle Bernard in Brolo, Sicily, in August 1943.

As part of the Allied invasion of Sicily, the Seventh United States Army under Lieutenant General George S. Patton and the British Eighth Army under General Sir Bernard Montgomery invaded the southeast corner of the island on 10 July 1943. Immediately after landing, the US units headed for the airports located in the southern part of the island, and some massacres of civilians were reported; one happened in Vittoria, where 12 Italians died, including Giuseppe Mangano, podestà (mayor) of Acate, and his seventeen-year-old son Valerio, who was killed by a bayonet stabbed in his face.

As part of Lieutenant General Omar Bradley's II Corps, the 45th Infantry Division was given a difficult task despite the fact that, of the divisions participating in the invasion, it was the only one to be "green," with no previous combat experience. The 45th Division's 157th and 179th Infantry Regiments were given the task of capturing several coastal towns and the Comiso Airport before they linked up with the 1st Canadian Infantry Division.

The 180th Infantry Regiment was given the task of capturing the Biscari airfield and linking up the US 1st Infantry Division. The 180th Infantry Regiment performed so poorly in the first 48 hours of the landing that Major General Troy H. Middleton considered relieving its commander. Instead, the assistant division commander was sent to exercise close supervision over the regiment.

During the capture of the Biscari airfield on 14 July 1943, troops of the 180th Infantry killed 71 Italian and two German POWs in two incidents. In the first incident 35 Italians and two Germans were killed, and 36 Italians were killed in the second incident.

== Massacre ==
=== West incident ===
On 14 July 1943, soldiers with the U.S. 180th Infantry Regiment were facing stiff enemy resistance near the Santo Pietro airfield, and by 10:00, they had taken a number of prisoners, including 45 Italians and 3 Germans. The executive officer for the 1st Battalion, 180th Infantry Regiment, Major Roger Denman, ordered a noncommissioned officer (NCO), Sergeant Horace Theodore West (13 December 1909 - 24 September 1994) who was then 33 years old, to take that group of prisoners "to the rear, off the road, where they would not be conspicuous, and hold them for questioning." The POWs were without shoes and shirts, which was a common practice to discourage escape attempts.

After Sergeant West, with several other U.S. soldiers assisting him, had marched the POWs about a mile, he halted the group and directed that eight or nine of them be separated from the rest and taken to the regimental intelligence officer (the S-2) for questioning. West then took the remaining POWs "off the road, lined them up, and borrowed a Thompson submachine gun" from the company first sergeant (the senior NCO in the company). When the First Sergeant asked West what he wanted it for, West responded that he was going to "kill the sons of bitches." West then told the soldiers guarding the POWs to "turn around if you don't want to see it."

He then killed the POWs by shooting them with the submachine gun. When the bodies were discovered thirty minutes later, it was noted that each POW had been shot through the heart, which indicated that it had been close range. Investigators later learned that after West had emptied the Thompson into the group of POWs, he "stopped to reload, then walked among the men in their pooling blood and fired a single round into the hearts of those still moving."

The next day, the 37 bodies caught the attention of a chaplain, Lieutenant Colonel William E. King. He reported the event to his senior officers, who at first dismissed it because of the bad press if it were to go public; however, after some convincing, they agreed to go to court for murder.

=== Compton incident ===
As commander of C Company, 1st Battalion, 180th Infantry Regiment, Captain John T. Compton landed south of the Acate River amidst sporadic mortar and small arms fire. Pursuing his first objective, he pushed his company towards Highway 115, joined with some 82nd Airborne Division paratroopers, and attacked several German positions. Compton did not sleep during the first three days of the invasion. He was simply "too excited to sleep." On the fourth day, he managed about an hour and a half of sleep before the attack on the Biscari airfield. Around 23:00, C Company set off and reached the airfield around 1100 on 14 July 1943. Immediately they began to receive artillery, mortar, and sniper fire. The sniper fire was especially deadly. From a concealed position in a nearby draw, the snipers targeted wounded American soldiers as well as the medics attempting to aid them. Out of the 34 men in Compton's 2nd Platoon, 12 were either wounded in action (WIA) or killed in action (KIA).

In an attempt to locate the snipers' firing position, Private Raymond C. Marlow crept down into a nearby draw. He had gone only about 25 yards into the draw before he spotted an Italian soldier with a rifle. Marlow raised his rifle and shouted at the Italian. The Italian ran away and entered a dugout farther in the draw. After a minute or two, the Italian soldier emerged with 35 others, several of whom were in civilian clothing. Marlow walked them up the hill to his outpost and reported to his squad leader, Sergeant Hair. "I told him that I had gotten those fellows that were shooting at us while we were getting out from under that artillery fire," Marlow reported. Acting as an interpreter, Private John Gazzetti asked the prisoners if they had been acting as snipers. He got no response. Hair herded the prisoners out of the draw and asked 1st Lieutenant Blanks what he should do with them. Blanks, in turn, asked Compton for instructions.

Compton asked Blanks if he was sure that they were the same snipers that had been shooting at them all day. When Blanks answered in the affirmative, Compton said bluntly, "Get them shot." Without hesitation, Blanks ordered Hair to assemble a firing squad and shoot the prisoners.

Compton accompanied the firing squad of about 11 men to the ridge overlooking the draw. He told the American soldiers to line up and they positioned themselves about six feet away from the prisoners. The prisoners started pleading for them not to shoot. Gazzetti, the interpreter, asked Compton if he had anything to say to the prisoners. Compton did not have anything that he wanted to ask them. Compton told the men to start firing on his order and stated that he "didn't want a man left standing when the firing was done." Seeing that their fate was sealed, a few of the prisoners began to run. The firing squad opened fire and killed all of the prisoners.

== Aftermath ==
When he was informed of the massacres, General Omar Bradley told General George Patton on the morning of the 15 July 1943 that US troops had murdered some 50-70 prisoners in cold blood. Patton noted his response in his diary:

I told Bradley that it was probably an exaggeration, but in any case to tell the Officer to certify that the dead men were snipers or had attempted to escape or something, as it would make a stink in the press and also would make the civilians mad. Anyhow, they are dead, so nothing can be done about it.

Bradley refused Patton's suggestions. Patton later changed his mind. After he learned that the 45th Division's Inspector General found "no provocation on the part of the prisoners.... They had been slaughtered," Patton is reported to have said, "Try the bastards."

The U.S. Army charged Sergeant Horace T. West for "willfully, deliberately, feloniously, [and] unlawfully" killing 37 prisoners of war in the first incident. At his trial, which began on 2 September 1943, West pleaded not guilty. Although he admitted the killings, his non-lawyer defense counsel raised two matters in his defense.

The first was he was "fatigued and under extreme emotional distress" at the time of the killings and was essentially temporarily insane at the time of the commission of the acts. However, First Sergeant Haskell Y. Brown testified that West had borrowed the Thompson and an additional magazine of 30 rounds and had appeared to act in cold blood.

The second defense raised by West's counsel was that he was simply following the orders of his commanding general, who he testified had announced prior to the invasion of Sicily that prisoners should be taken only under limited circumstances. West's regimental commander, Colonel Forrest E. Cookson, testified that the general had stated that if the enemy continued to resist after US troops had come within 200 yards of their defensive position, surrender of those enemy soldiers need not be accepted. The problems with that defense were that the prisoners-of-war had already surrendered, and the surrender had been accepted.

The court-martial panel found West guilty of premeditated murder, stripped him of his rank, and sentenced him to life imprisonment. He was detained in North Africa for fear that his presence in a federal penitentiary could bring unwanted publicity to him and to his crime. On reviewing West's record of trial, Eisenhower decided to "give the man a chance" after he had "served enough of his life sentence to demonstrate that he could be returned to active duty". After West's brother wrote to the Army and his local US representative, it was decided to "resolve the worrisome matter" and on the recommendation of the War Department's Bureau of Public Relations, the Deputy Commander of Allied Headquarters in Italy signed an order remitting West's sentence on 24 November 1944 after 14 months of imprisonment. He was restored to active duty and continued to serve during the war at the end of which he received an honorable discharge.

In regard to the second incident, Captain John T. Compton was also court-martialed and charged with the premeditated murder of 36 POWs under his charge. He also pleaded not guilty, and relying upon the respondeat superior legal doctrine, also defended his actions by claiming that he was merely following orders of his commanding general given in a speech to the officers in his division. On 23 October 1943 the court martial panel acquitted him, but the Judge Advocate's review of the trial declared that in his opinion, Compton's actions had been unlawful. Compton was transferred to the 179th Infantry Regiment and subsequently was killed in action on 8 November 1943 in Italy.

The commanding general named by both West and Compton was Patton. The War Department Inspector General's office conducted an investigation into the killings, and in the course of the investigation General Patton was questioned about the alleged speech. Patton stated that his comments in the speech had been misinterpreted and nothing he had said "by the wildest stretch of the imagination" could have been taken as an order to murder POWs. The investigation ultimately cleared Patton of any wrongdoing.

== See also ==
- Allied war crimes during World War II
- List of massacres in Italy
- Perfidy
- Third Geneva Convention

== Sources ==
- Atkinson, Rick (2007). The Day of Battle: The War in Sicily and Italy, 1943–1944 (The Liberation Trilogy). New York: Henry Holt and Co. p. 119. ISBN 978-0-8050-6289-2.
- Balboni, Mark (2021). Corruption of Conscience: George Patton and the Biscari Massacres, Maintaining the High Ground: the Profession and Ethic in Large-Scale Combat Operations p. 187-208
- Bartolone, Giovanni (2005). Le altre stragi. Le stragi alleate e tedesche nella Sicilia del 1943–1944. Bagheria: Tipografia Aiello & Provenzano.
- Borch, Fred. "War Crimes in Sicily: Sergeant West, Captain Compton, and the Murder of Prisoners of War in 1943" (PDF). The Army Lawyer (March 2013): 1–6.
- Botting, Douglas; Ian Sayer (1989). Hitler's Last General: The Case Against Wilhelm Mohnke. London: Bantam Books. pp. 354–359. ISBN 0-593-01709-9.
- Holland, James (2020). Sicily '43: The First Assault on Fortress Europe (Hardback). London: Bantam Press. ISBN 978-1-7876-3293-6.
- Kelly, Tom Harper. "War Criminal Paroled: Horace T. West and the Final Chapter of the Biscari Massacre" (PDF). The Army Lawyer (5 2020): 19–22.
- Marshell, Nathaniel (2024). "'This is Orders': The Santo Pietro Massacres and the Failure of American Military Justice." Journal of Contemporary History.https://doi.org/10.1177/00220094231225373
- Mikaberidze, Alexander (2013). Atrocities, Massacres, and War Crimes: An Encyclopedia. Vol. 1. Santa Barbara, California: ABC-CLIO. ISBN 9781598849264.
- Robbins, Christopher (2000). Test of Courage: The Michel Thomas Story. New York: Simon & Schuster. ISBN 978-0-7432-0263-3.
- Weingartner, James (November 1989). "Massacre at Biscari: Patton and An American War Crime". The Historian. LII (1): 24–39. doi:10.1111/j.1540-6563.1989.tb00772.x.
- U.S. Department of the Army, Record of Trial for the General Court-Martial of United States v. CPT. John T. Compton, CM 250835, U.S. Army Judiciary, Arlington, VA.
- U.S. Department of the Army, Record of Trial for the General Court-Martial of United States v. SGT Horace T. West, CM 250833, U.S. Army Judiciary, Arlington, VA.
