= Santo Pietro =

- Frazione
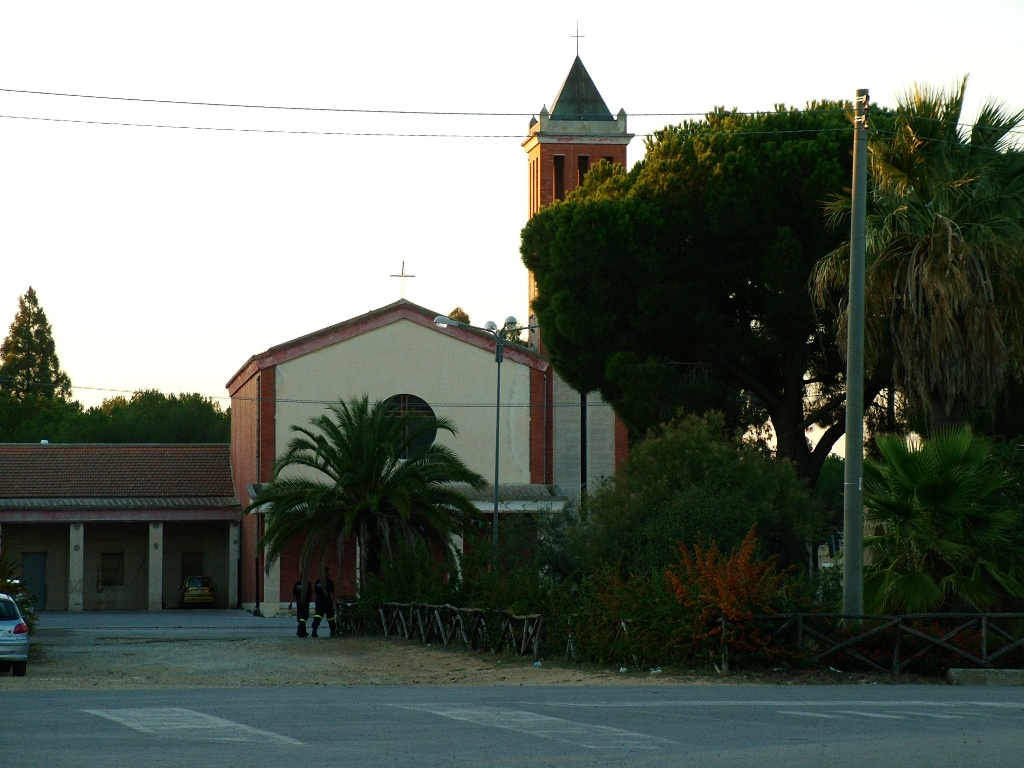
- Church of Saints Peter and Paul

- Location of Santo Pietro in Italy
- Coordinates: 37°5′58″N 14°29′56″E
- Country: Italy
- Region: Sicily
- Province: Catania (CT)
- Comune: Caltagirone
- Elevation: 280 m (920 ft)

Population (2001)
  - Total: 91
- Time zone: UTC+1 (CET)
  - Summer (DST): UTC+2 (CEST)
- Postal code: 95041

Santo Pietro is a small village (frazione) of the Comune of Caltagirone, Sicily, Italy, with a population of c. 90 people.

== History ==
The settlement was founded as Mussolinia di Sicilia, one of several settlements across Italy founded by the fascist government of Benito Mussolini. It was intended to be a garden city, but it was never completed.

During the Second World War, Military Airfield 504 in Santo Pietro di Caltagirone was used by the Axis powers to launch attacks on British bases on Malta. Elements of Jagdgeschwader 53 operated from the site in early 1942 and again in late 1942 during operations against Malta. In April 1943, the II. group of Jagdgeschwader 51 used the airfield to hand over its remaining aircraft to Jagdgeschwader 77 before relocating to Bari. The airstrip functioned mainly as a transfer and staging point, not as a permanent base.

In 1943 during World War II, this was one of the sites of the Biscari massacre, the massacre of 73 Axis soldiers altogether. The current name was adopted after World War II.

== Geography ==
The Riserva naturale orientata Bosco di Santo Pietro is located near the town and is characterized by a highly diverse Mediterranean ecosystem. Three principal habitats can be identified in the Santo Pietro area: cork oak woodland, holm oak woodland, and garrigue.
