= SS Talamba =

British hospital ship

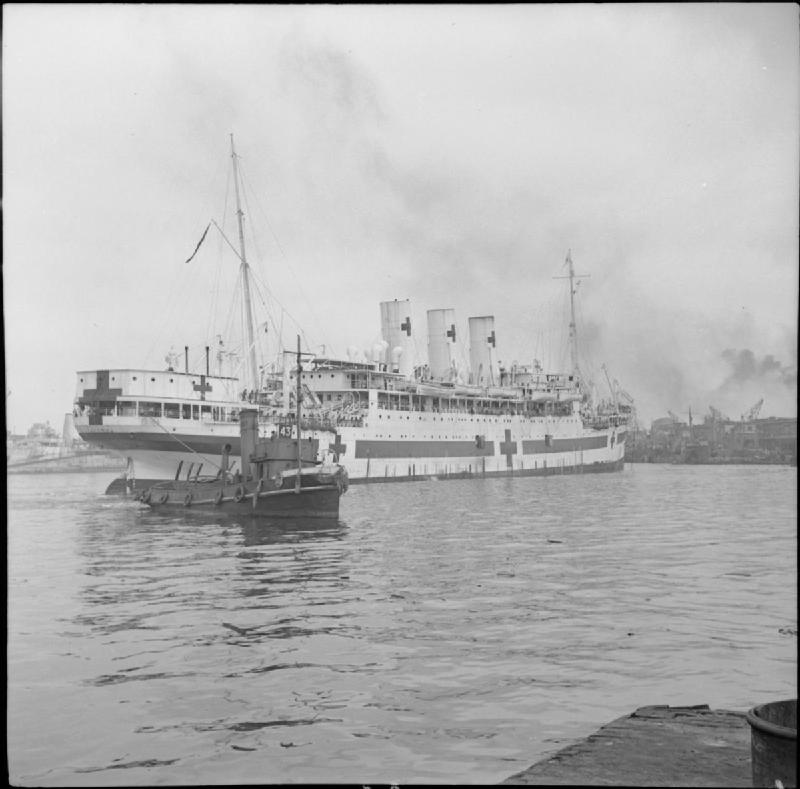
- HMHS Talamba as a hospital ship on 24 April 1943.

History

United Kingdom
- Name: SS Talamba
- Namesake: Talamba
- Owner: British India Steam Navigation Company; (1924-1938); Royal Navy; (1938-1943)
- Builder: Hawthorn Leslie, Hebburn
- Yard number: 533
- Laid down: 1924
- Launched: 16 July 1924
- Completed: 2 October 1924
- Reclassified: HMHS Talamba (No.35 & 43)
- Identification: Callsign: GKNM
- Fate: Sunk by Regia Aeronautica in 1943.

General characteristics
- Type: Ocean liner; Hospital ship
- Displacement: 8018 tons
- Length: 137.4 m (450 ft 9 in)
- Beam: 19.4 m (63 ft 8 in)
- Draft: 9 ft 1 in (2.77 m)
- Depth: 17.1 m (56 ft 1 in)
- Installed power: 4x Triple expansion turbines; 2x shafts
- Speed: 17 knots (31 km/h)
- Boats & landing craft carried: 14 x Lifeboats
- Capacity: 8100 dwt

SS Talamba was a British ocean liner which was converted to a hospital ship in 1941. She was named after Tulamba, Pakistan.

== Construction and career ==
She was launched and completed in 1924. She was owned by British India Steam Navigation Company. SS Talamba while sailing from Singapore, an attempt to rush the ship’s bridge by the Chinese deportees but was contained and escorted by HMS Carlisle to Hong Kong.

In 1937, she was grounded after a typhoon at Hong Kong. SS Talamba was designated as a hospital ship in June 1941.

HMHS Talamba assisted in the evacuation of Singapore in January 1942 after the Imperial Japanese have started their conquest over Asia, part of the Pacific Theatre of World War II.

During the amphibious invasion of Sicily, she was attacked twice by the Italian Regia Aeronautica and German Luftwaffe. A bomb fell into her engine room which caused an explosion that killed 5 of her crew but all 400 wounded were evacuated to safety. HMHS Talamba, sank off Syracuse on 10 July 1943.
