= Battle of the Atlantic =

Naval campaign in World War II

- Part of the Second World War
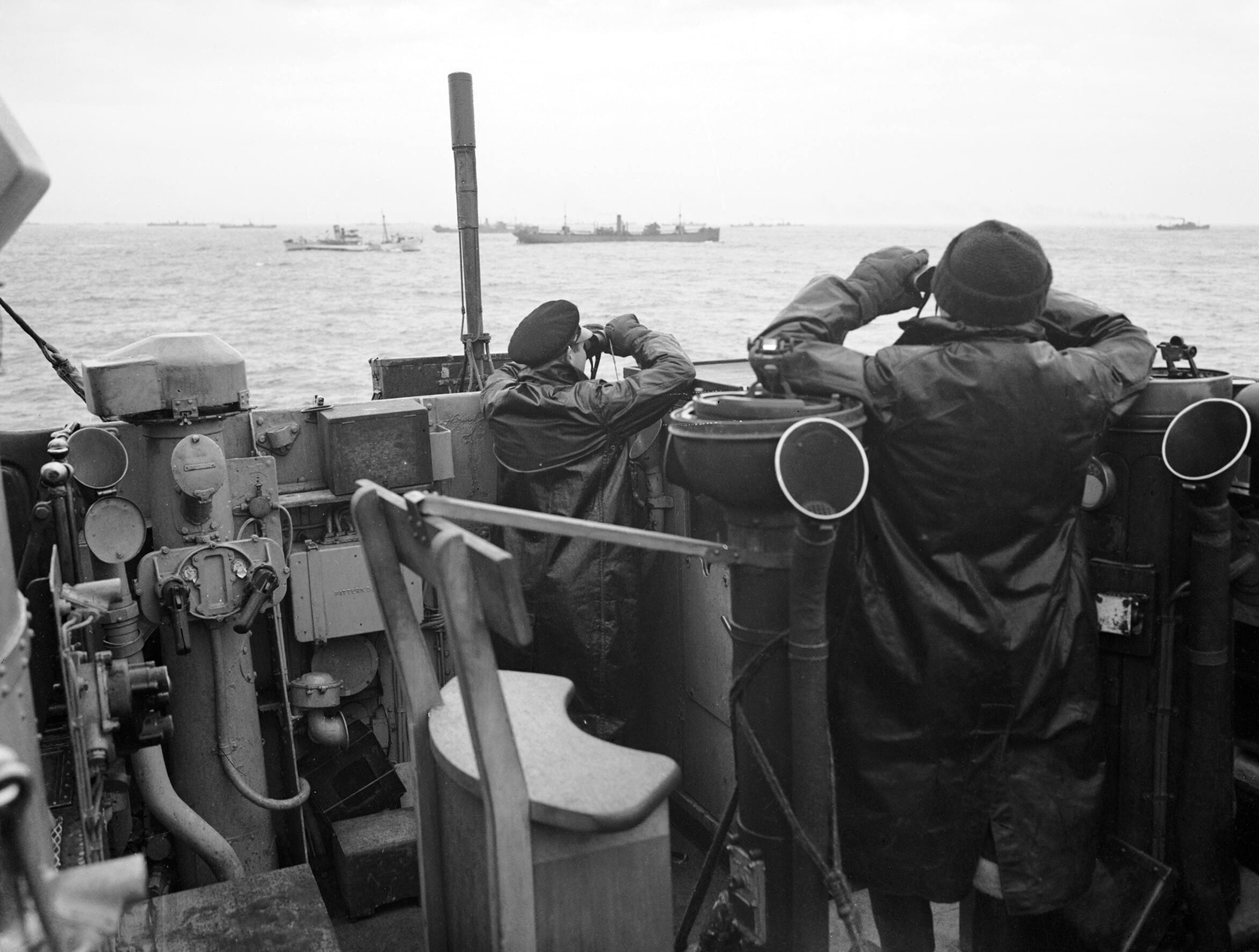
- Officers on the bridge of an escorting British destroyer stand watch for enemy submarines, October 1941
Date	3 September 1939 – 8 May 1945 (5 years, 8 months and 5 days)
Location	Atlantic Ocean, Río de la Plata, North Sea, Irish Sea, Labrador Sea, Gulf of St. Lawrence, Caribbean Sea, Gulf of Mexico, Outer Banks, Arctic Ocean
Result	Allied victory

Belligerents
United Kingdom; United States (Note: 1941–1945); Soviet Union (Note: 1941–1945); Canada; (Vargas Era) Brazil (Note: 1942–1945); Other participants: Norway; France (Note: This included the French Third Republic from 1939 to 1940; the Free French Naval Forces from 1940 to 1944; and the Provisional Government of the French Republic from 1944 to 1945); Poland; Netherlands; Belgium; Greece; Australia; New Zealand; Newfoundland; India; South Africa	Germany; Italy (Note: 1940–1943)

Commanders and leaders
(Canada) Leonard W. Murray; (United Kingdom) Dudley Pound #; (United Kingdom) Andrew Cunningham; (United Kingdom) Martin Dunbar-Nasmith; (United Kingdom) Percy Noble; (United Kingdom) Max Horton; (United Kingdom) Frederick Bowhill; (United Kingdom) Philip de la Ferté; (United Kingdom) John Slessor; (United States) Royal E. Ingersoll; (United States) Jonas H. Ingram	(Nazi Germany) Erich Raeder; (Nazi Germany) Karl Dönitz; (Nazi Germany) H.G. von Friedeburg; (Nazi Germany) Eberhard Godt; (Nazi Germany) Alfred Saalwächter; (Nazi Germany) Wilhelm Marschall; (Nazi Germany) Theodor Krancke; (Nazi Germany) Martin Harlinghausen; (Nazi Germany) Ulrich Kessler; (Kingdom of Italy) Angelo Parona; (Kingdom of Italy) Romolo Polacchini; (Kingdom of Italy) Enzo Grossi

Casualties and losses
36,200 killed (naval); 36,000 killed (merchant navy); 3,500 merchant vessels lost; 175 warships lost; 741 RAF Coastal Command aircraft lost in anti-submarine sorties	(Nazi Germany) ≈30,000 U-boat sailors killed; 783 submarines lost; 47 other warships lost; (Kingdom of Italy) c. 500 killed; 17 submarines lost

The Battle of the Atlantic, the longest continuous military campaign in World War II, ran from 1939 to the defeat of Nazi Germany in 1945, covering a major part of the naval history of World War II. At its core was the Allied naval blockade of Germany, announced the day after the declaration of war, and Germany's subsequent counterblockade. The campaign peaked from mid-1940 to the end of 1943.

The Battle of the Atlantic pitted U-boats and other warships of the German Kriegsmarine (navy) and aircraft of the Luftwaffe (air force) against the Royal Navy, Royal Canadian Navy, United States Navy, and Allied merchant shipping. Convoys, coming mainly from North America and predominantly going to the United Kingdom and the Soviet Union, were protected for the most part by the British and Canadian navies and air forces. These forces were aided by ships and aircraft of the United States beginning on 13 September 1941. The Germans were joined by submarines of the Italian Regia Marina (royal navy) after Germany's Axis ally Italy entered the war on 10 June 1940.

As an island country, the United Kingdom was highly dependent on imported goods. Britain required more than a million tons of imported material per week in order to survive and fight. The Battle of the Atlantic involved a tonnage war: the Allies struggled to supply Britain while the Axis targeted merchant shipping critical to the British war effort. Rationing in the United Kingdom was also used with the aim of reducing demand, by reducing wastage and increasing domestic production and equality of distribution. From 1942 onwards, the Axis also sought to prevent the build-up of Allied supplies and equipment in the UK in preparation for the invasion of occupied Europe. The defeat of the U-boat threat was a prerequisite for pushing back the Axis in western Europe. The outcome of the battle was a strategic victory for the Allies—the German tonnage war failed—but at great cost: 3,500 merchant ships and 175 warships were sunk in the Atlantic for the loss of 783 U-boats and 47 German surface warships, including 4 battleships (Bismarck, Scharnhorst, Gneisenau, and Tirpitz), 9 cruisers, 7 raiders, and 27 destroyers. This front was a main consumer of the German war effort: Germany spent more money to produce naval vessels than every type of ground vehicle combined, including tanks.

The Battle of the Atlantic has been called the "longest, largest, and most complex" naval battle in history. Starting immediately after the European war began, during the Phoney War, the battle lasted for over five years until the German surrender in May 1945. It involved thousands of ships in a theatre covering millions of square miles of ocean. The situation changed constantly, with one side or the other gaining advantage, as participating countries surrendered, joined and even changed sides in the war, and as new weapons, tactics, countermeasures and equipment were developed. The Allies gradually gained the upper hand, overcoming German surface-raiders by the end of 1942 and defeating the U-boats by mid-1943, though losses due to U-boats continued until the war's end. British prime minister Winston Churchill later wrote, "The only thing that really frightened me during the war was the U-boat peril. I was even more anxious about this battle than I had been about the glorious air fight called the 'Battle of Britain'."

== Name ==
On 5 March 1941, the First Lord of the Admiralty, A. V. Alexander, asked Parliament for "many more ships and great numbers of men" to fight "the Battle of the Atlantic", which he compared to the Battle of France fought the previous summer. The first meeting of the Cabinet's "Battle of the Atlantic Committee" was on 19 March. Churchill claimed to have coined the phrase "Battle of the Atlantic" shortly before Alexander's speech, but there are several examples of earlier usage. (Note: Ernest Lindley, St. Joseph News-Press 1940, "Until the outcome of the battle of the Atlantic can be more clearly foreseen, there would be high risks both to Japan and ourselves in becoming engaged in war." and Sargint, H.J.J., "Mighty Nazi effort to invade England now in the making: Observers see amphibious attack as Hitler's anticipated thrust against British Isles", Miami News, 1941. "This country is fighting a battle which may well be called the battle of the Atlantic, though it is not more than an extension of the battle of Britain.")

== Background ==
Following the use of unrestricted submarine warfare by Germany in the First World War, countries tried to limit or abolish submarines. The effort failed. Instead, the London Naval Treaty required submarines to abide by "cruiser rules", which demanded they surface, search and place ship crews in "a place of safety" (for which lifeboats did not qualify, except under particular circumstances) before sinking them, unless the ship in question showed "persistent refusal to stop...or active resistance to visit or search". These regulations did not prohibit arming merchantmen, but doing so, or having them report contact with submarines (or raiders), made them de facto naval auxiliaries and removed the protection of the cruiser rules.

The Treaty of Versailles forbade the Germans to operate U-boats and reduced the German surface fleet to a few obsolete ships. When three of these obsolete ships were due to be replaced, the Germans opted to construct the Deutschland-class of Panzerschiffe ('armoured ships'); or pocket battleships as they were nicknamed by foreign navies. These ships were designed for commerce raiding on distant seas, to operate as a raider hunting for independently sailing ships, and to avoid combat with superior forces.

The Anglo-German Naval Agreement of 1935 allowed Hitler to renounce the Treaty of Versailles, and to build a fleet 35% the size of Britain's. A building programme for four battleships, two aircraft carriers, five heavy cruisers, destroyers and U-boats was immediately initiated. After the agreement, Hitler thought conflict with the UK very unlikely; consequently, the fleet was designed for commerce raiding against the French, not to challenge command of the sea. The commander of the German U-boats, Karl Dönitz, had his own opinions. In contrast with Hitler and Erich Raeder, chief of the German navy, he considered war with the UK inevitable and that a large surface fleet was not needed, believing U-boats could defeat the British. According to his calculations, a fleet of 300 medium Type VII U-boats could sink a million tons of ships a month and within a year sink enough of the about 3,000 British merchant ships (comprising 17.5 million tons) to strangle the British economy. In the First World War, U-boats had been defeated mainly by the convoy system, but Dönitz thought this could be overcome with the Rudeltaktik, wherein a patrol line of U-boats would search for a convoy before converging and attacking together at night from the surface. Neither aircraft nor early forms of sonar (called ASDIC by the British) were then considered serious threats. ASDIC could not detect a surfaced submarine and its range was less than that of an electric torpedo, aircraft could not operate at night and, during the day, an alert U-boat could dive before the aircraft attacked. Dönitz failed to persuade Raeder, so, each time that the U-boat fleet was expanded, Raeder chose to build a mix of coastal, medium and large submarines, even minelayers and U-cruisers. Even when in 1938 Hitler realised he would sooner or later have to oppose the UK and launched his Plan Z, only a minority of the planned 239 U-boats were medium U-boats.

== Anti-submarine warfare ==
With the introduction of ASDIC, the British Admiralty believed the submarine threat effectively neutralized. Consequently, the number of destroyers and convoy escorts was reduced and the anti-submarine branch seen as third rate. Destroyers were also equipped with ASDIC, but it was expected that these ships would be used in fleet actions rather than anti-submarine warfare, so they were not extensively trained in their use. Trials with ASDIC were usually conducted in ideal conditions and the Admiralty failed to appreciate ASDIC's flaws. Its range was limited, worked poorly at speeds above eight knots, was hampered by rough weather and required a very skilled operator to distinguish echoes from thermoclines, whales, shoals of fish and wrecks. Early versions could not look directly down, so contact would be lost during the final stages of a depth charge attack. The basic set could detect range and bearing, but target depth could only be estimated from the range at which contact was lost. (Note: The Q attachment was a later addition to ASDIC, providing an extra beam that looked directly down. This gave an accurate depth of the target)

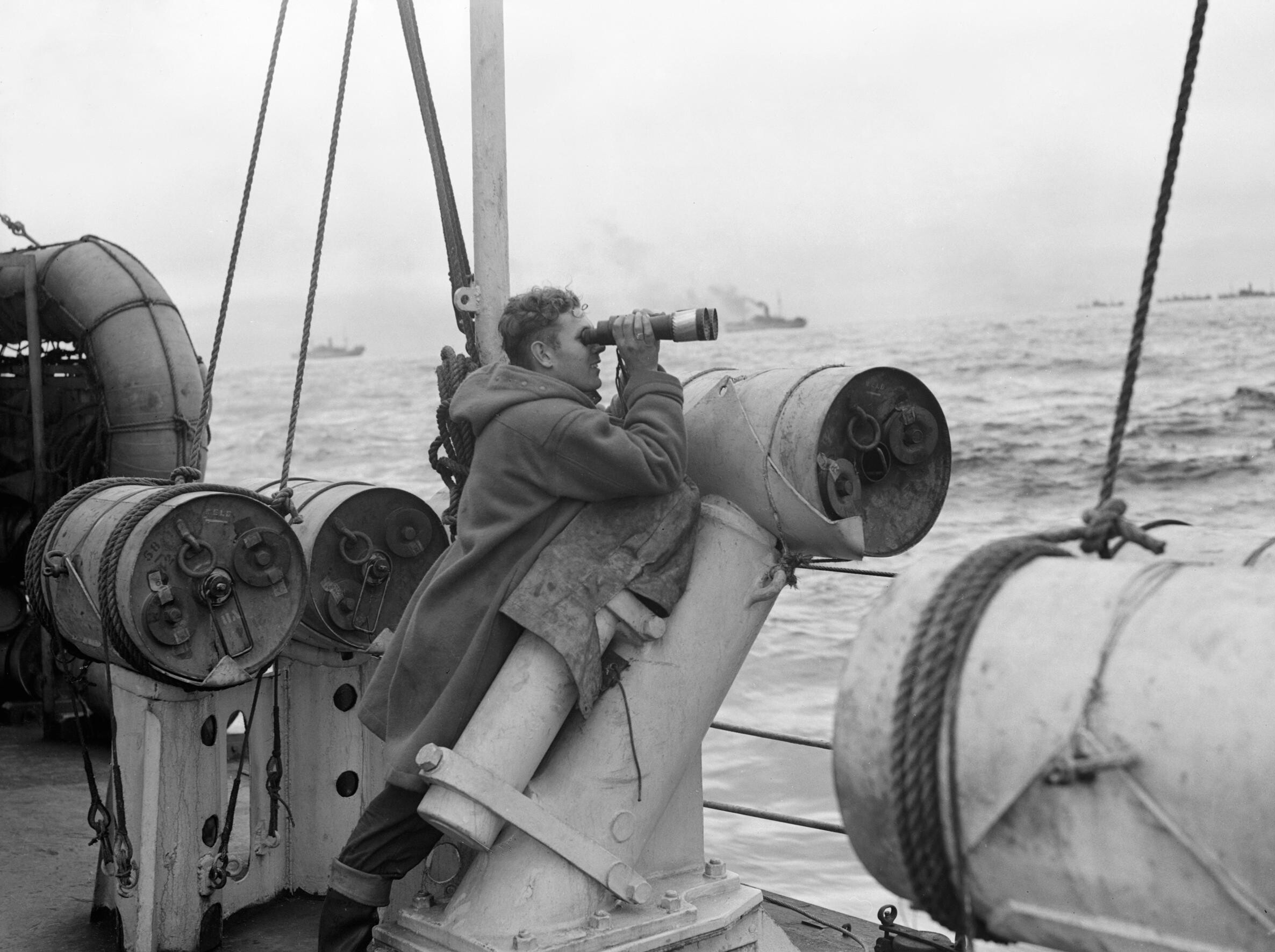
A lookout of a convoy escort, posing his binoculars on a depth charge thrower with which depth charges were launched to the sides of the escort

An escort swept its ASDIC beam in an arc from one side of its course to the other, stopping the transducer every few degrees to send out a signal. On detection of a submarine, the escort would close in at moderate speed and increase its speed to attack. The intention was to pass over the submarine, rolling depth charges from chutes at the stern, while throwers fired further charges to either side, laying a pattern of depth charges. To disable a submarine, a depth charge had to explode within about 20 ft (6.1 m). Since early ASDIC equipment was poor at determining depth, it was usual to vary the depth settings on part of the pattern.

As the threat of war loomed in early 1939, Britain realised it could not rely on the London Naval Treaty, which outlawed unrestricted submarine warfare. The organisational infrastructure for convoys had been maintained since World War I, with a thorough and systematic upgrade in the second half of the 1930s, but not enough escorts were available for convoy escorting, and a crash programme for building Tree-class trawlers, Flower-class corvettes and Hunt-class destroyers was initiated. Merchant ships that were either too fast or too slow for convoys were to be equipped with a self-defence gun against surfaced submarine attacks, thus forcing an attacking U-boat to spend its precious torpedoes. This removed these ships from the protection of the cruiser rules under the prize law.

Despite this lack of readiness, in 1939 the Royal Navy probably had as many ASDIC equipped warships in service as all the other navies of the world combined.

Similarly the role of aircraft had been neglected; the Royal Air Force had organised a Coastal Command to support the Royal Navy, but it possessed insufficient aircraft, had no long-range aircraft nor were aircraft crew trained in anti-submarine warfare. The only weapon against submarines was inadequate bombs. Finally, it was not forgotten that in World War I mines had sunk more U-boats than any other weapon. Plans were drafted for minefields in the Channel and along the east coast in defence of shipping lanes, and also offensive mine barrages on the German U-boat lanes towards the Atlantic Ocean.

== September 1939 – May 1940 ==
In 1939, the Kriegsmarine lacked the strength to challenge the combined British Royal Navy and French Navy (Marine Nationale) for command of the sea. Instead, German naval strategy relied on commerce raiding using capital ships, armed merchant cruisers, submarines and aircraft. Many German warships were already at sea when war was declared in September 1939, including most of the available U-boats and the "pocket battleships" Deutschland and Admiral Graf Spee which had sortied into the Atlantic in August. These ships immediately attacked British and French shipping. U-30 sank the ocean liner SS Athenia within hours of the declaration of war — in breach of her orders not to sink passenger ships. The U-boat fleet, which was to dominate so much of the Battle of the Atlantic, was small at the beginning of the war; many of the 57 available U-boats were the small and short-range Type IIs, useful primarily for minelaying and operations in British coastal waters. Much of the early German anti-shipping activity involved minelaying by destroyers, aircraft and U-boats off British ports.

With the outbreak of war, the British and French immediately began a blockade of Germany, with little immediate effect on German industry. The Royal Navy quickly introduced a convoy system for the protection of trade that gradually extended out from the British Isles, eventually reaching as far as Panama, Bombay and Singapore. Convoys allowed the Royal Navy to concentrate its escorts near the one place the U-boats were guaranteed to be found, the convoys. Each convoy consisted of between 30 and 70 mostly unarmed merchant ships.

Some British naval officials, particularly the First Lord of the Admiralty, Winston Churchill, sought a more offensive strategy. The Royal Navy formed anti-submarine hunting groups based on aircraft carriers to patrol the shipping lanes in the Western Approaches and hunt for German U-boats. This strategy was deeply flawed because a U-boat, with its tiny silhouette, was likely to spot the surface warships and submerge long before it was sighted. The carrier aircraft were little help; although they could spot submarines on the surface, at this stage of the war they had no adequate weapons to attack them, and any submarine found by an aircraft was long gone by the time surface warships arrived. The hunting group strategy proved a disaster within days. On 14 September 1939, Britain's most modern carrier, HMS Ark Royal, narrowly avoided being sunk when three torpedoes from U-39 exploded prematurely. U-39 was forced to surface and scuttle by the escorting destroyers, becoming the first U-boat loss of the war. Another carrier, HMS Courageous, was sunk three days later by U-29.

German success in sinking Courageous was surpassed a month later when Günther Prien in U-47 penetrated the British base at Scapa Flow and sank the old battleship HMS Royal Oak at anchor (Note: He repeated a Great War feat by U-18.) immediately becoming a hero in Germany.

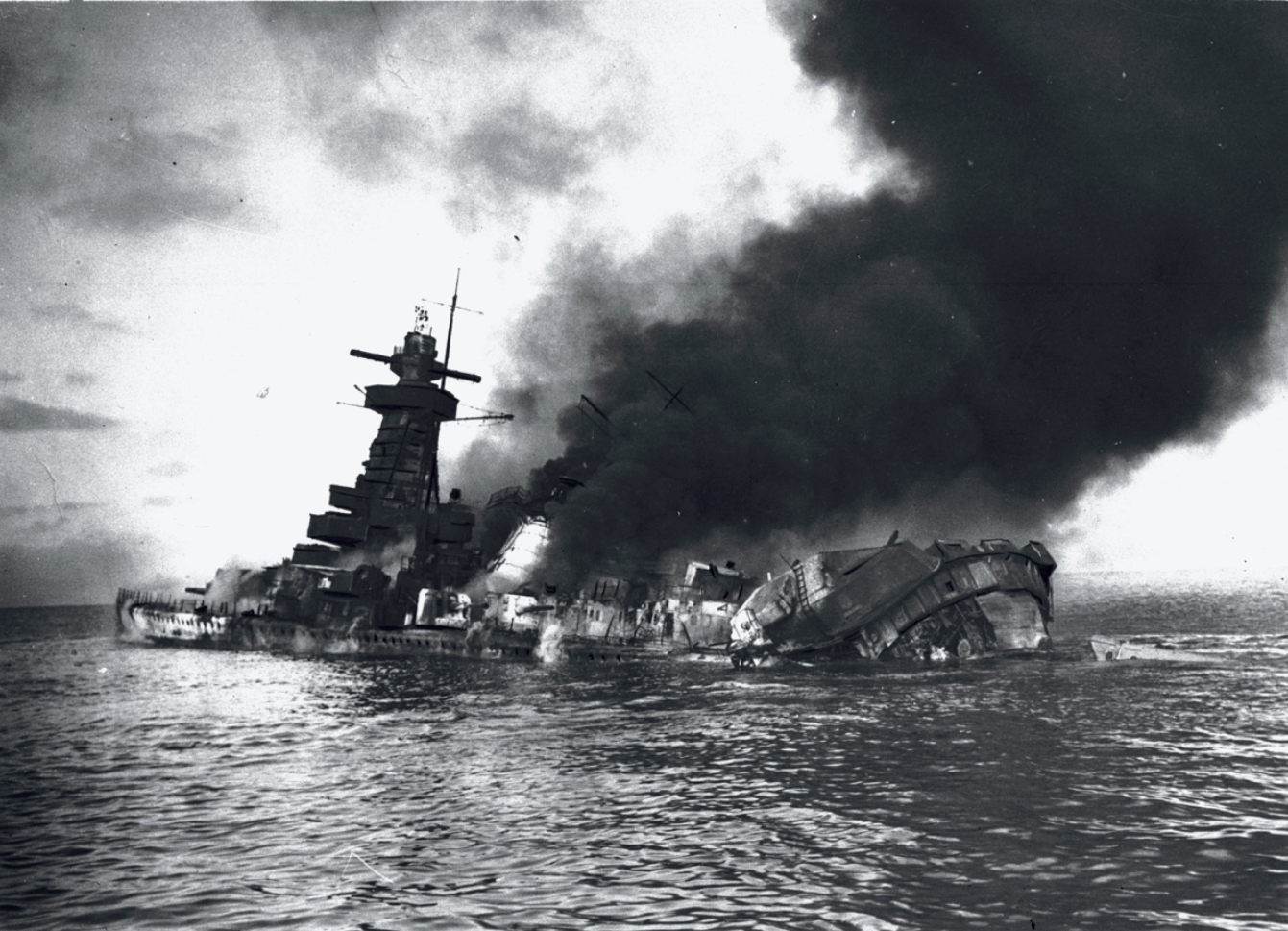
Admiral Graf Spee shortly after her scuttling

In the South Atlantic, British forces were stretched by the cruise of Admiral Graf Spee, which sank nine merchant ships of 50,000 gross register tons (GRT) in the South Atlantic and Indian Ocean during the first three months of war. The British and French formed hunting groups including three battlecruisers, three aircraft carriers, and 15 cruisers to seek the raider and her sister Deutschland, which was operating in the North Atlantic. These hunting groups had no success until Admiral Graf Spee was caught off the mouth of the River Plate between Argentina and Uruguay by an inferior British force. After suffering damage in the subsequent action, she took shelter in neutral Montevideo harbour and was scuttled on 17 December 1939.

After this initial burst of activity, the Atlantic campaign quietened. Admiral Karl Dönitz, commander of the U-boat fleet, had planned a maximum submarine effort for the first month of the war, with almost all the available U-boats out on patrol in September. That level of deployment could not be sustained; the boats needed to return to harbour to refuel, re-arm, re-stock supplies, and refit. The harsh winter of 1939–40 froze many of the Baltic ports, seriously hampering the German offensive by trapping several new U-boats in the ice. Hitler's plans to invade Norway and Denmark in early 1940 led to the withdrawal of the fleet's surface warships and most of the ocean-going U-boats for fleet operations in Operation Weserübung.

The resulting Norwegian campaign revealed serious flaws in the German U-boat torpedoes: both the impact pistol and the magnetic influence pistol (detonation mechanism) were defective, and the torpedoes did not run at the proper depth, often undershooting targets. Only one British warship was sunk by U-boats in more than 38 attacks. The news spread through the U-boat fleet and undermined morale. Since the effectiveness of the magnetic pistol was already reduced by the degaussing of Allied ships, Dönitz decided to use new contact pistols copied from British torpedoes found in the captured submarine HMS Seal. The depth setting mechanism was improved but only in January 1942 were the last complications with that mechanism discovered and fixed, making the torpedo more reliable.

=== British situation ===
The German occupation of Norway in April 1940, the rapid conquest of the Low Countries and France in May and June, and the Italian entry into the war on the Axis side in June transformed the war at sea in general and the Atlantic campaign in particular in three main ways:

- Britain lost its biggest ally. In 1940, the French Navy was the fourth largest in the world. Only a handful of French ships joined the Free French Naval Forces and fought against Germany, though these were later joined by a few Canadian destroyers. With the French fleet removed from the campaign, the Royal Navy was stretched even further. Italy's declaration of war meant that Britain also had to reinforce the Mediterranean Fleet and establish a new group at Gibraltar, Force H, to replace the French fleet in the Western Mediterranean.
- The U-boats gained direct access to the Atlantic. Since the English Channel was relatively shallow, and was partially blocked with minefields by mid-1940, U-boats were ordered not to negotiate it and instead travel around the British Isles to reach the most profitable spot to hunt ships. The German bases in France at Brest, Lorient, and La Pallice near La Rochelle, were about 450 miles (720 km) closer to the Atlantic than the bases on the North Sea. This greatly improved the situation for U-boats in the Atlantic, enabling them to attack convoys further west and letting them spend longer on patrol, doubling the effective size of the U-boat force. The Germans later built huge fortified concrete submarine pens for the U-boats in the French Atlantic bases, impervious to Allied bombing until mid-1944 with the advent of the Tallboy bomb. From early July, U-boats returned to the new French bases when they had completed their Atlantic patrols, the first being U-30 at Lorient.
- British destroyers were diverted from the Atlantic. The Norwegian campaign and the German invasion of the Low Countries and France strained the Royal Navy's destroyer flotillas. Many older destroyers were withdrawn from convoy routes to support the Norwegian campaign in April and May and then diverted to the English Channel to support the withdrawal from Dunkirk. By mid-1940, Britain faced a serious threat of invasion. Many destroyers were held in the Channel to repel a German invasion. They suffered heavily under air attack by the Luftwaffe's Fliegerführer Atlantik. Seven destroyers were lost in the Norwegian campaign, another six in the Battle of Dunkirk and a further 10 in the Channel and North Sea between May and July, many to air attack because they lacked an adequate anti-aircraft armament. (Note: Between April and July 1940, the Royal Navy lost 24 destroyers, the Royal Canadian Navy one.) Dozens of others were damaged.

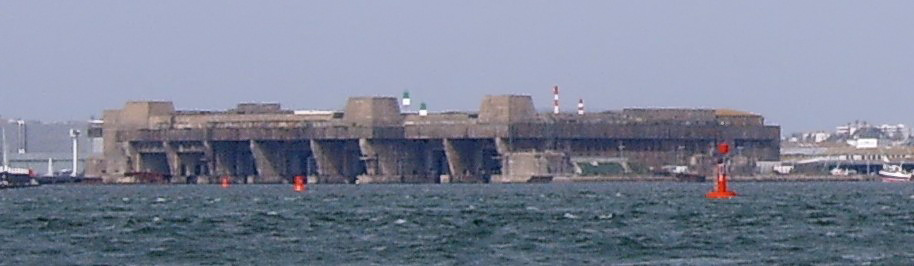
German submarine pens in Lorient, Brittany

Completion of Hitler's campaign in Western Europe meant U-boats withdrawn from the Atlantic for the Norwegian campaign could return to the war on trade. Therefore, the number of U-boats in the Atlantic began to rise while the availability of convoy escorts greatly decreased. The only consolation for the British was that the large merchant fleets of occupied countries like Norway and the Netherlands came under British control. After the German occupation of Denmark and Norway, Britain occupied Iceland and the Faroe Islands, establishing bases and preventing a German takeover.

It was in these circumstances that Winston Churchill, who had become prime minister on 10 May 1940, first wrote to President Franklin Roosevelt to request the loan of fifty obsolescent US Navy destroyers. This led to the "Destroyers for Bases Agreement", effectively a sale portrayed as a loan for political reasons, which operated in exchange for 99-year leases on certain British bases in Newfoundland, Bermuda and the West Indies. This was a profitable bargain for the United States and militarily beneficial for Britain, freeing up British military assets to return to Europe. A significant percentage of the US population opposed entering the war, and some American politicians (including the US Ambassador to Britain, Joseph P. Kennedy) believed Britain and its allies might lose. The first of these destroyers were only taken over by their British and Canadian crews in September, and all needed to be rearmed and fitted with ASDIC. It was many months before these ships contributed to the campaign.

== June 1940 – February 1941 (The Happy Time) ==
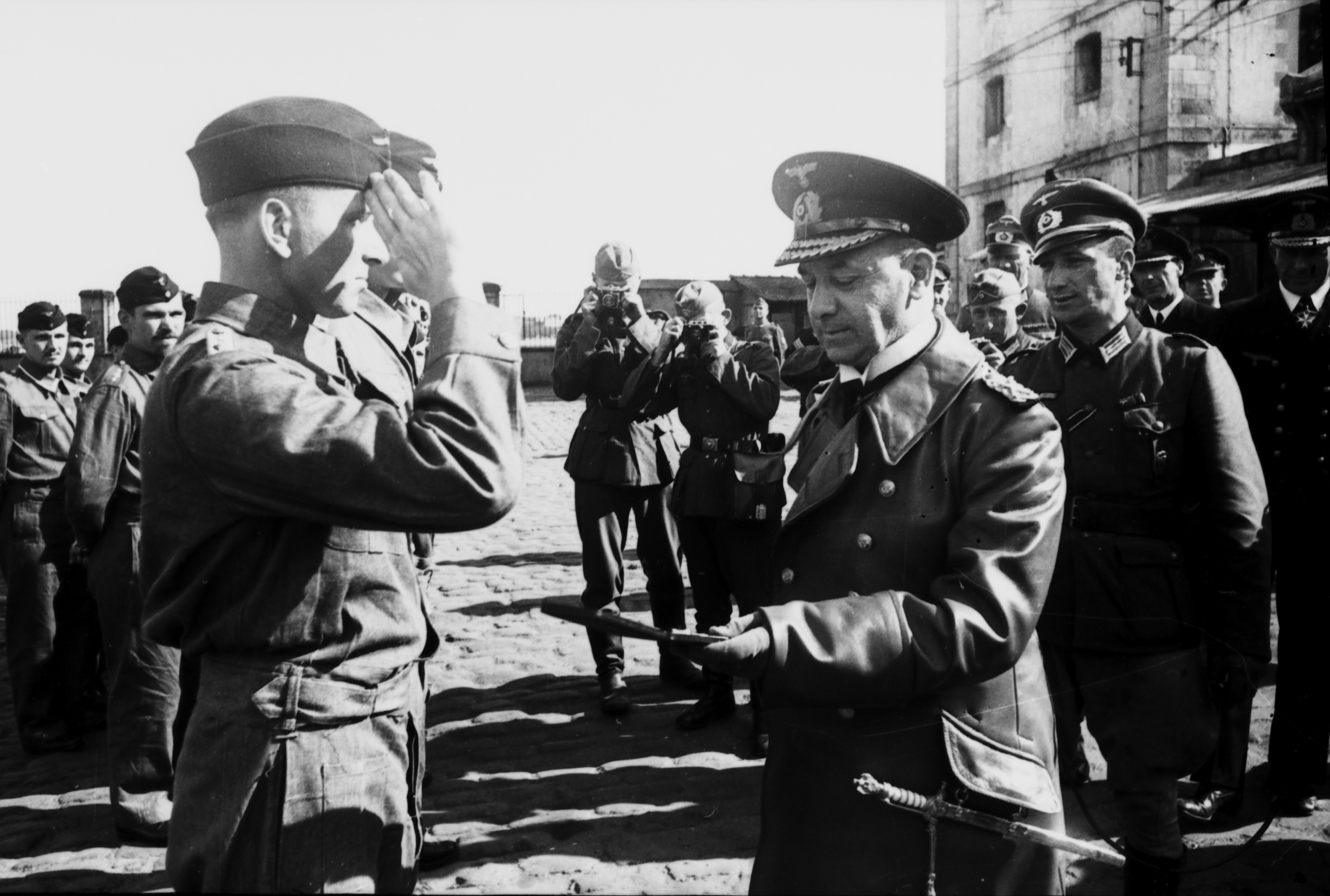
Grand Admiral Erich Raeder with Otto Kretschmer (left), August 1940

The early U-boat operations from the French bases were spectacularly successful. This was the heyday of the great U-boat aces like Günther Prien of U-47, Otto Kretschmer (U-99), Joachim Schepke (U-100), Engelbert Endrass (U-46), Victor Oehrn (U-37) and Heinrich Bleichrodt (U-48). U-boat crews became heroes in Germany. From June until October 1940, over 270 Allied ships were sunk; this period was referred to by U-boat crews as "the Happy Time" ("Die Glückliche Zeit"). Churchill would later write: "...the only thing that ever frightened me during the war was the U-boat peril".

The biggest challenge for U-boats was to find the convoys in the vastness of the ocean. The Germans had a handful of very long-range Focke-Wulf Fw 200 Condor aircraft based at Bordeaux and Stavanger, which were used for reconnaissance. The Condor was a converted civilian airliner—a stop-gap solution for Fliegerführer Atlantik. Due to ongoing friction between the Luftwaffe and Kriegsmarine, the primary source of convoy sightings was the U-boats themselves. Since a submarine's bridge was very close to the water, their range of visual detection was short.

The best source proved to be the codebreakers of B-Dienst who had succeeded in deciphering the British Naval Cypher No. 3, allowing the Germans to estimate where and when convoys could be expected.

In response, the British applied the techniques of operations research and developed some counterintuitive solutions for protecting convoys. Realising the area of a convoy increased by the square of its perimeter, they determined that the same number of ships and escorts would be better protected in a single convoy than two. A large convoy was as difficult to locate as a small one. Reduced frequency also reduced the chances of detection, as fewer large convoys could carry the same amount of cargo, while large convoys take longer to assemble. Therefore, a few large convoys with apparently few escorts were safer than many small convoys with a higher ratio of escorts to merchantmen.

Instead of attacking the Allied convoys singly, U-boats were directed to work in wolf packs (Rudel) coordinated by radio. The boats spread out into a long patrol line that bisected the path of the Allied convoy routes. Once in position, the crew studied the horizon through binoculars looking for masts or smoke, or used hydrophones to pick up propeller noises. When one boat sighted a convoy, it would report the sighting to U-boat headquarters, shadowing and continuing to report as needed until other boats arrived, typically at night. Instead of being faced by single submarines, the convoy escorts then had to cope with groups of up to half a dozen U-boats attacking simultaneously. The most daring commanders, such as Kretschmer, penetrated the escort screen and attacked from within the columns of merchantmen. The escort vessels, which were too few in number and often lacking in endurance, had no answer to multiple submarines attacking on the surface at night, as their ASDIC worked well only against underwater targets. Early British marine radar, working in the metric bands, lacked target discrimination and range. Corvettes were too slow to catch a surfaced U-boat.

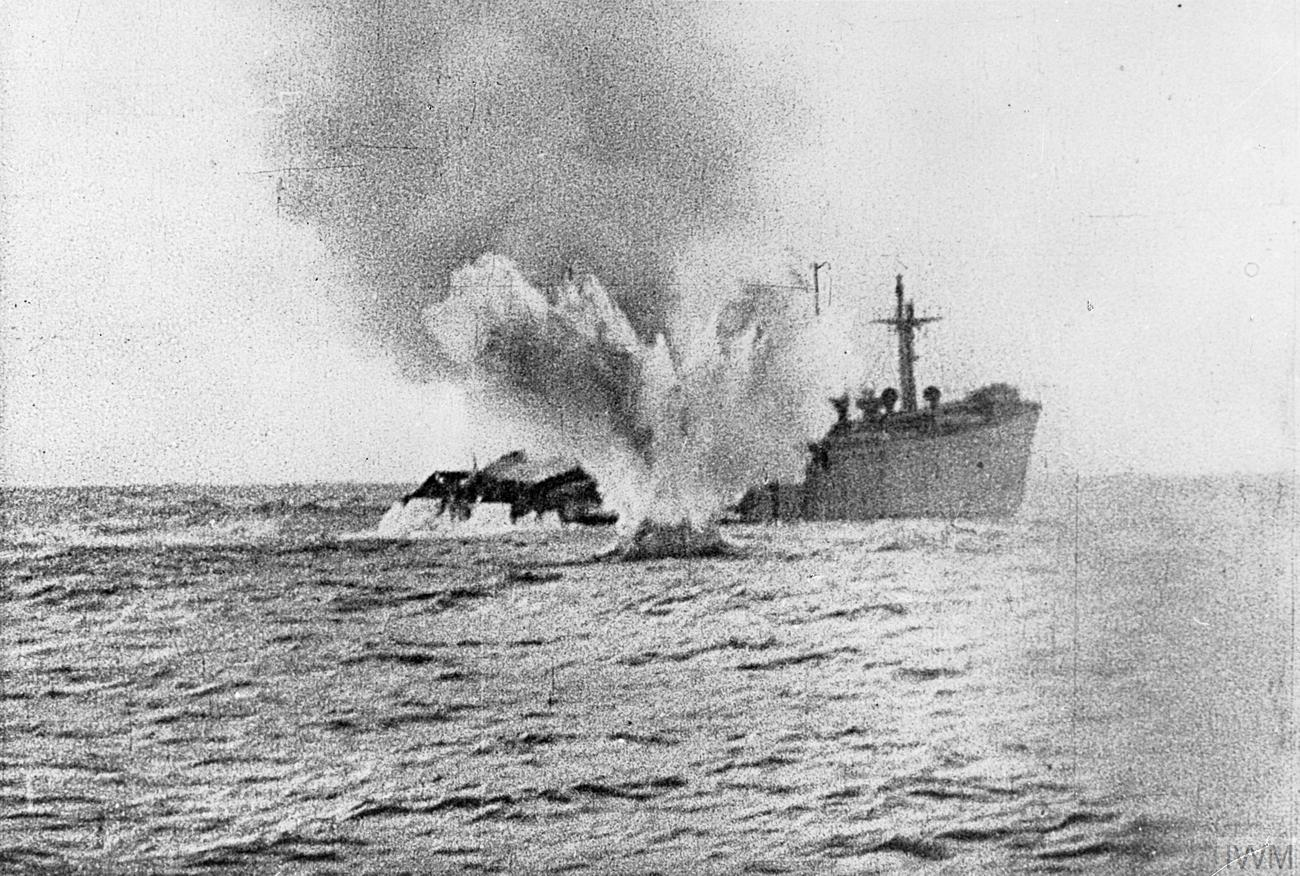
A U-boat shells a merchant ship which has remained afloat after being torpedoed.

Pack tactics were first used successfully in September and October 1940 to devastating effect, in a series of convoy battles. On 21 September, convoy HX 72 of 42 merchantmen was attacked by a pack of four U-boats, which sank eleven ships and damaged two over the course of two nights. In October, the slow convoy SC 7, with an escort of two sloops and two corvettes, was overwhelmed, losing 59% of its ships. The battle for HX 79 in the following days was in many ways worse for the escorts than for SC 7. The loss of a quarter of the convoy without any loss to the U-boats, despite a very strong escort (two destroyers, four corvettes, three trawlers, and a minesweeper) demonstrated the effectiveness of the German tactics against the inadequate British anti-submarine methods. On 1 December, seven German and three Italian submarines caught HX 90, sinking 10 ships and damaging three others.

At the end of 1940, the Admiralty viewed the number of ships sunk with growing alarm. Damaged ships might survive but could be out of commission for long periods. Two million gross tons of merchant shipping—13% of the fleet available to the British—were under repair and unavailable, which had the same effect in slowing down cross-Atlantic supplies.

Nor were the U-boats the only threat. Following some early experience in support of the war at sea during Operation Weserübung, the Luftwaffe began to take a toll of merchant ships. Martin Harlinghausen and his recently established command—Fliegerführer Atlantik—contributed small numbers of aircraft to the Battle of the Atlantic from 1941 onwards. These were primarily Fw 200 Condors. The Condors also bombed convoys that were beyond land-based fighter cover and thus defenceless. Initially, the Condors were very successful, claiming 365,000 tons of shipping in early 1941. These aircraft were few in number, and directly under Luftwaffe control; the pilots had little specialised training for anti-shipping warfare, limiting their effectiveness.

=== Italian submarines in the Atlantic ===
The Germans received help from their allies. From August 1940, a flotilla of 27 Italian submarines operated from the BETASOM base in Bordeaux to attack Allied shipping in the Atlantic, initially under the command of Rear Admiral Angelo Parona, then of Rear Admiral Romolo Polacchini and finally of ship-of-the-line captain Enzo Grossi. The Italian submarines had been designed to operate in a different way than U-boats, and they had flaws that needed to be corrected (for example, huge conning towers, slow speed when surfaced, and lack of modern torpedo fire control), which meant that they were ill-suited for convoy attacks, and performed better when hunting down isolated merchantmen on distant seas, taking advantage of their superior range and living standards. Initial operation met with little success (only 65,343 GRT sunk between August and December 1940), but the situation improved gradually, and up to August 1943 the 32 Italian submarines that operated there sank 109 ships of 593,864 tons, for 17 subs lost in return, giving them a subs-lost-to-tonnage sunk ratio similar to Germany's in the same period, and higher overall. The Italians were also successful with their use of "human torpedo" chariots, disabling several British ships in Gibraltar.

Despite these successes, the Italian intervention was not favourably regarded by Dönitz, who characterised Italians as "inadequately disciplined" and "unable to remain calm in the face of the enemy". They were unable to co-operate in wolf pack tactics or even reliably report contacts or weather conditions, and their area of operation was moved away from that of the Germans.

Amongst the more successful Italian submarine commanders who operated in the Atlantic were Carlo Fecia di Cossato, commander of the Enrico Tazzoli, and Gianfranco Gazzana-Priaroggia, commander of Archimede and then of Leonardo da Vinci.

== Great surface raiders ==
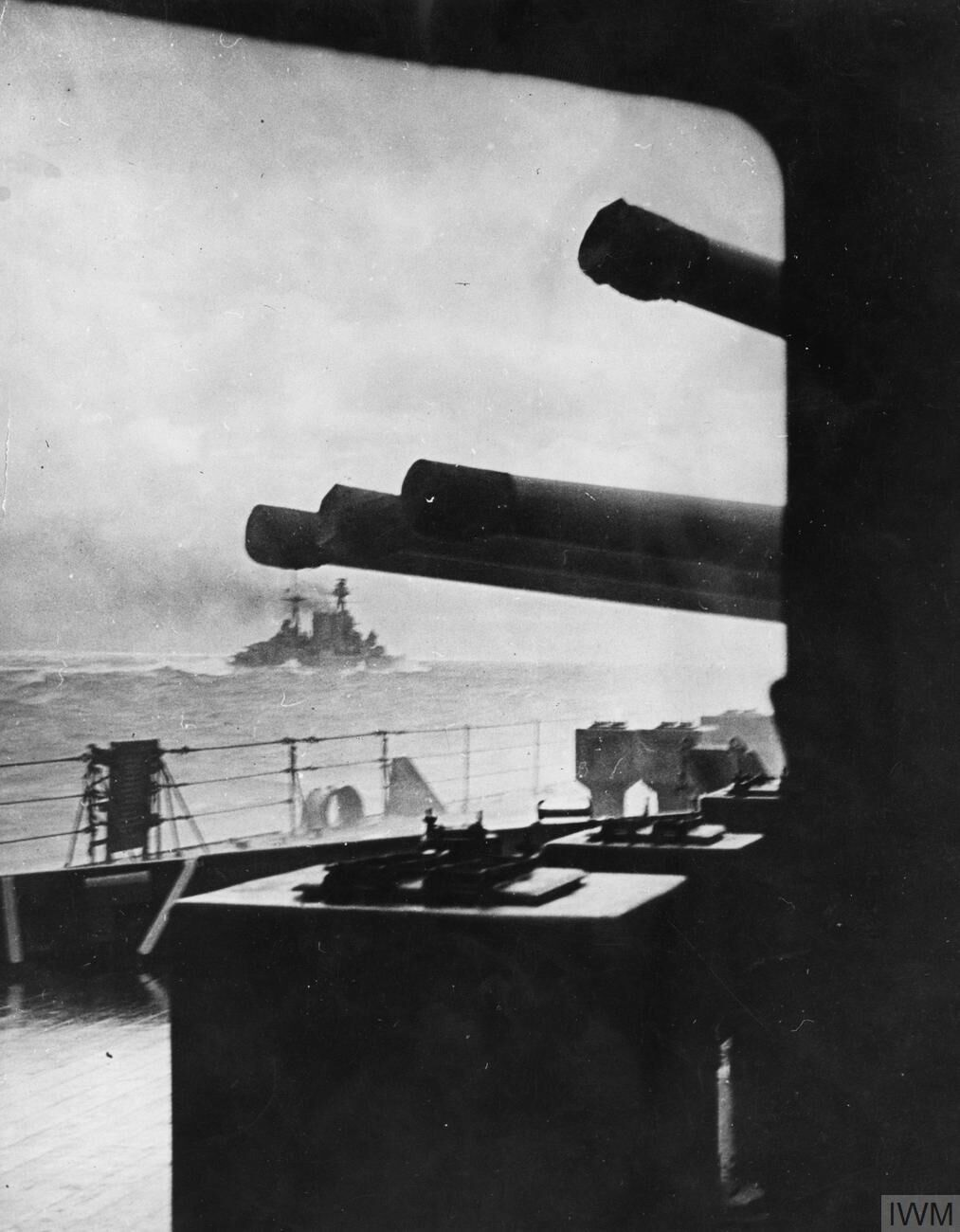
The battlecruiser HMS Hood (in the distance) steaming into battle minutes before being sunk by the German battleship Bismarck on 24 May 1941

Despite their success, U-boats were still not recognised as the foremost threat to the North Atlantic convoys. With the exception of men like Dönitz, most naval officers on both sides regarded surface warships as the ultimate commerce destroyers.

For the first half of 1940, there were no German surface raiders in the Atlantic because the German Fleet had been concentrated for the invasion of Norway. The sole pocket battleship raider, Admiral Graf Spee, had been stopped at the Battle of the River Plate by an inferior and outgunned British squadron. From mid-1940 a small but steady stream of warships and armed merchant raiders set sail from Germany for the Atlantic.

The power of a raider against a convoy was demonstrated by the fate of Convoy HX 84, attacked by the pocket battleship Admiral Scheer on 5 November 1940. Admiral Scheer quickly sank five ships and damaged several others as the convoy scattered. Only the sacrifice of the escorting armed merchant cruiser HMS Jervis Bay (whose commander, Edward Fegen, was awarded a posthumous Victoria Cross) and failing light allowed the other merchantmen to escape. The British suspended North Atlantic convoys and the Home Fleet put to sea in an unsuccessful attempt to intercept Admiral Scheer, which disappeared into the South Atlantic. She reappeared in the Indian Ocean the following month.

Other German surface raiders now began to make their presence felt. On Christmas Day 1940, the cruiser Admiral Hipper attacked the troop Convoy WS 5A, but was driven off by the escorting cruisers. Admiral Hipper had more success two months later, on 12 February 1941, when she found the unescorted Convoy SLS 64 of 19 ships, sinking seven. In January 1941, the battleships Scharnhorst and Gneisenau put to sea from Germany to raid the shipping lanes in Operation Berlin. With so many German raiders at large in the Atlantic, the British were forced to provide battleship escorts to as many convoys as possible. This twice saved convoys from slaughter by the German battleships. In February, the old battleship HMS Ramillies deterred an attack on Convoy HX 106. A month later, SL 67 was saved by the presence of HMS Malaya.

In May, the Germans mounted the most ambitious raid of all: Operation Rheinübung. The new battleship Bismarck and the cruiser Prinz Eugen put to sea to attack convoys. A British fleet intercepted the raiders off Iceland. In the Battle of the Denmark Strait, the battlecruiser HMS Hood was blown up and sunk, but Bismarck was damaged and had to run to France. Bismarck nearly reached her destination, but was disabled by an airstrike from the carrier Ark Royal, and then sunk by the Home Fleet the next day. Her sinking marked the end of the warship raids. The advent of long-range search aircraft, notably the unglamorous but versatile PBY Catalina, largely neutralised surface raiders.

In February 1942, Scharnhorst, Gneisenau and Prinz Eugen moved from Brest back to Germany in the "Channel Dash". While this was an embarrassment for the British, it was the end of the German surface threat in the Atlantic. The loss of Bismarck, the destruction of the network of supply ships that supported surface raiders, the repeated damage to the three ships by air raids, (Note: For a significant part of 1941, the Scharnhorst, Gneisenau and Prinz Eugen were all out of service whilst bomb damage was being repaired in the Brest naval dockyard. Scharnhorst was successfully attacked by the RAF at La Pallice on 24 July 1941 and repairs took 4 months. Gneisenau was hit by a torpedo on 6 April 1941 then bombed again whilst in dry dock, necessitating lengthy repairs, then received minor bomb damage on 18 December. Prinz Eugen was seriously damaged by a bomb on 1 July 1941 and was under repair for the rest of the year. The resulting demands on the dockyard at Brest caused delays in the servicing of U-boats as there was a shortage of workers with the right skills.) the entry of the United States into the war, Arctic convoys, and the perceived invasion threat to Norway had persuaded Hitler and the naval staff to withdraw.

== March–May 1941 ==
Losses of merchant ships (blue) and U-boats (red) in 1941

The disastrous convoy battles of October 1940 forced a change in British tactics. The most important of these was the introduction of permanent escort groups to improve the coordination and effectiveness of ships and men in battle. British efforts were helped by a gradual increase in the number of escort vessels available as the old ex-American destroyers and the new British- and Canadian-built Flower-class corvettes were now coming into service in numbers. Many of these ships became part of the huge expansion of the Royal Canadian Navy, which grew from a handful of destroyers at the outbreak of war to take an increasing share of convoy escort duty. Others of the new ships were crewed by Free French, Norwegian and Dutch, but these were a tiny minority of the total number, and directly under British command. By 1941 American public opinion had begun to swing against Germany, but the war was still essentially Great Britain and the Empire against Germany.

Initially, the new escort groups consisted of two or three destroyers and half a dozen corvettes. Since two or three of the group would usually be in dock repairing weather or battle damage, the groups typically sailed with about six ships. The training of the escorts also improved as the realities of the battle became obvious. A new base was set up at Tobermory in the Hebrides to prepare the new escort ships and their crews for the demands of battle under the strict regime of Vice-Admiral Gilbert O. Stephenson.

In February 1941, the Admiralty moved the headquarters of Western Approaches Command from Plymouth to Liverpool, where much closer contact with, and control of, the Atlantic convoys was possible. Greater cooperation with supporting aircraft was also achieved. In April, the Admiralty took over operational control of Coastal Command aircraft. Tactically, new short-wave radar sets that could detect surfaced U-boats and were suitable for both small ships and aircraft began to arrive during 1941.

The impact of these changes first began to be felt in the battles in early 1941. In early March, Prien in U-47 failed to return from patrol. Two weeks later, in the battle of Convoy HX 112, the newly formed 3rd Escort Group of four destroyers and two corvettes held off the U-boat pack. U-100 was detected by the primitive radar on the destroyer HMS Vanoc, rammed and sunk. Shortly afterwards U-99 was also caught and sunk, its crew captured. Dönitz had lost his three leading aces: Kretschmer, Prien, and Schepke.

Dönitz now moved his wolf packs further west, in order to catch the convoys before the anti-submarine escort joined. This new strategy was rewarded at the beginning of April when the pack found Convoy SC 26 before its anti-submarine escort had joined. Ten ships were sunk, but another U-boat was lost.

== June–December 1941 ==
=== Growing American activity ===
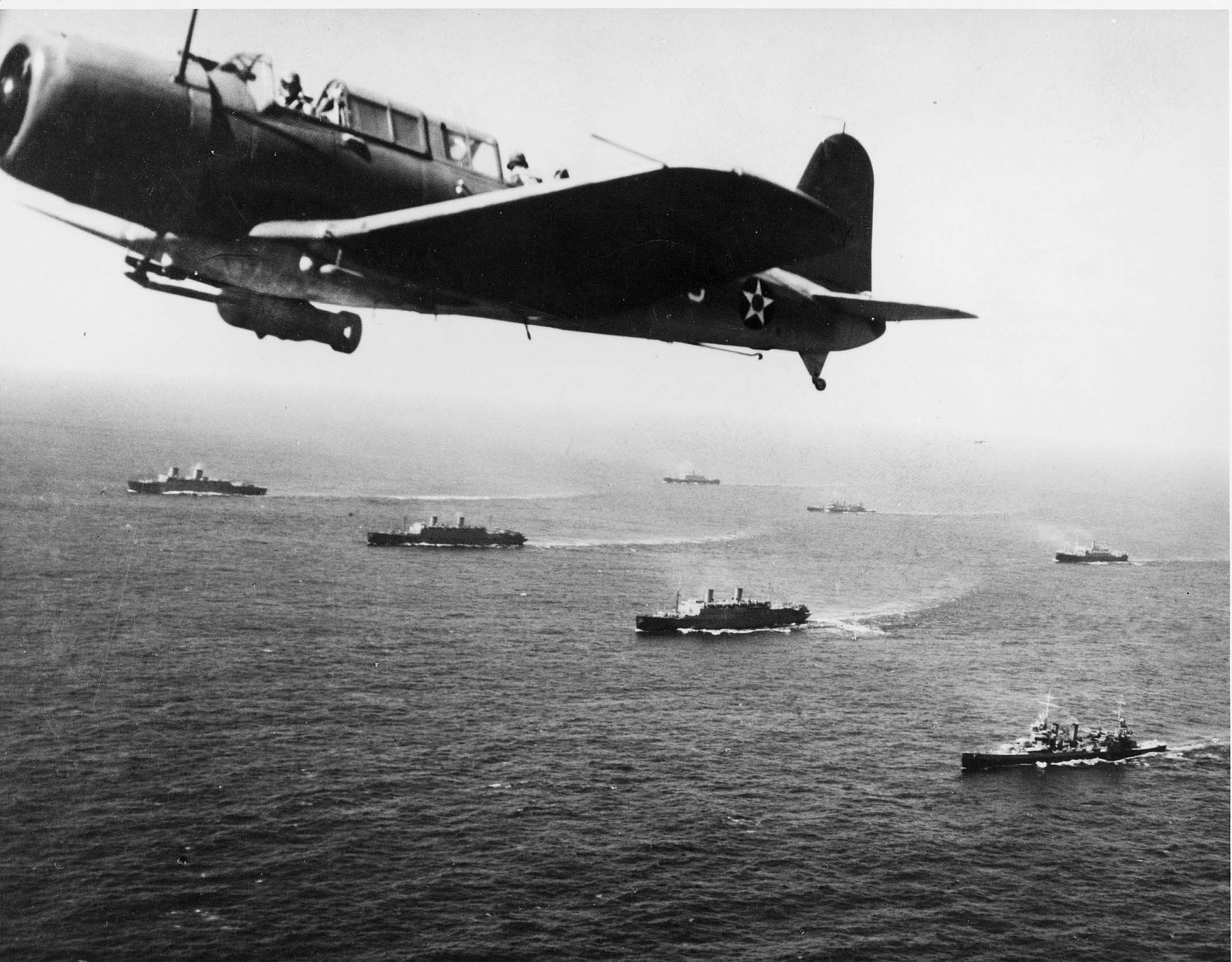
A SB2U Vindicator scout bomber from USS Ranger flies anti-submarine patrol over Convoy WS-12, en route to Cape Town, 27 November 1941. The convoy was one of many escorted by the US Navy on "Neutrality Patrol", before the US officially entered the war.

In June 1941, the British decided to provide convoy escort for the full length of the North Atlantic crossing. To this end, the Admiralty asked the Royal Canadian Navy on 23 May, to assume the responsibility for protecting convoys in the western zone and to establish the base for its escort force at St. John's, Newfoundland. On 13 June 1941, Commodore Leonard Murray, Royal Canadian Navy, assumed his post as Commodore Commanding Newfoundland Escort Force, under the overall authority of the Commander-in-Chief, Western Approaches, at Liverpool. Six Canadian destroyers and 17 corvettes, reinforced by seven destroyers, three sloops, and five corvettes of the Royal Navy, were assembled for duty in the force, which escorted the convoys from Canadian ports to Newfoundland and then on to a meeting point south of Iceland, where the British escort groups took over.

By 1941, the United States was taking an increasing part in the war, despite its nominal neutrality. In April 1941 President Roosevelt extended the Pan-American Security Zone east almost as far as Iceland. British forces occupied Iceland when Denmark fell to the Germans in 1940; the US was persuaded to provide forces to relieve British troops on the island. American warships began escorting Allied convoys in the western Atlantic as far as Iceland, and had several hostile encounters with U-boats.

In June 1941, the US realised the tropical Atlantic had become dangerous for unescorted American as well as British ships. On 21 May, SS Robin Moor, an American vessel carrying no military supplies, was sunk by U-69 750 nautical miles (1,390 km) west of Freetown, Sierra Leone. When news of the sinking reached the US, few shipping companies felt truly safe anywhere. As Time magazine noted in June 1941, "if such sinkings continue, U.S. ships bound for other places remote from fighting fronts, will be in danger. Henceforth the U.S. would either have to recall its ships from the ocean or enforce its right to the free use of the seas."

A Mid-Ocean Escort Force of British, Canadian, and American destroyers and corvettes was organised following the declaration of war by the United States in December 1941.

At the same time, the British were working on technical developments to address the German submarine superiority. Though these were British inventions, the critical technologies were provided freely to the US, which then renamed and manufactured them. Likewise, the US provided the British with Catalina flying boats and Liberator bombers that were important contributions to the war effort.

=== Catapult aircraft merchantmen ===
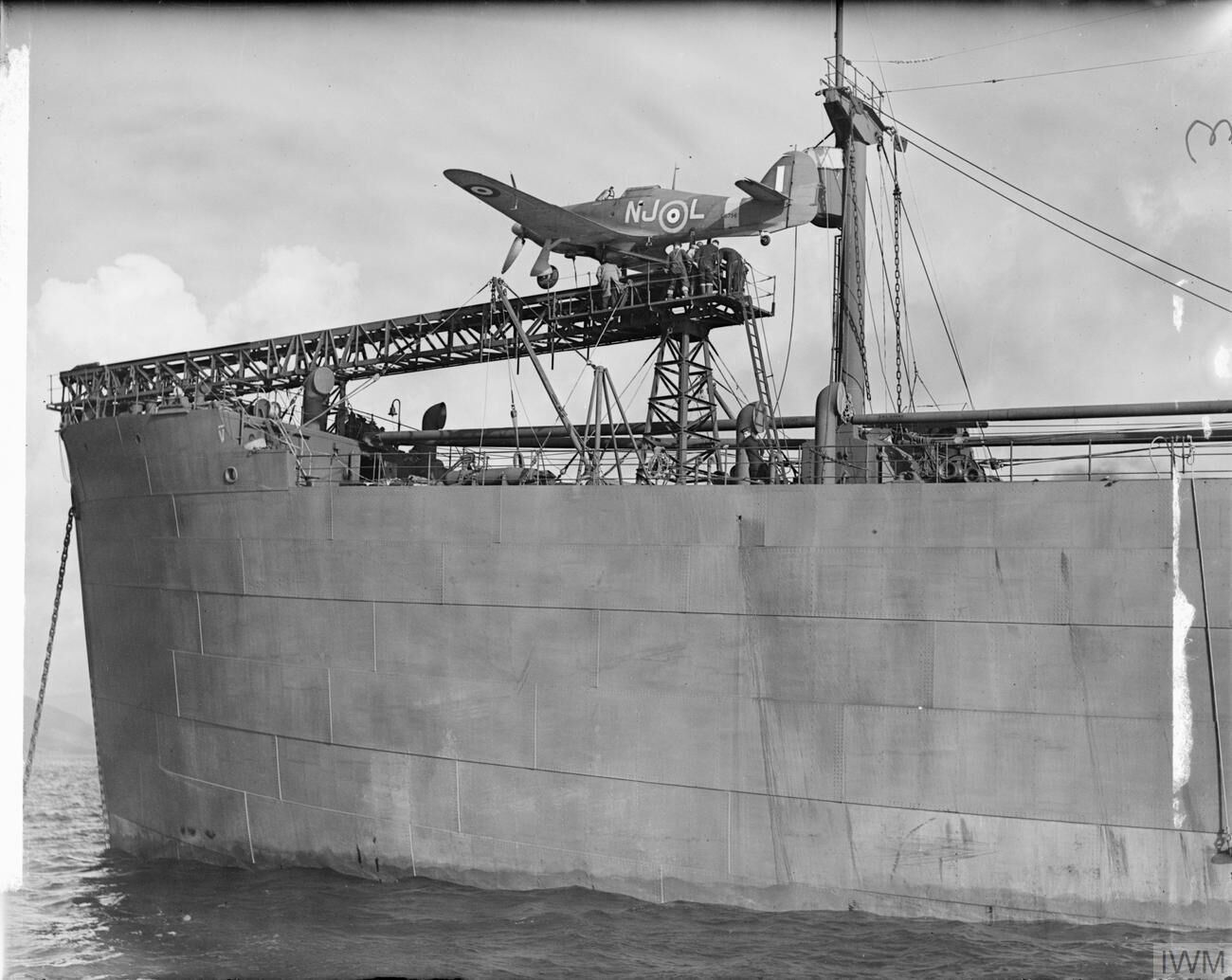
Sea Hurricane Mk IA on the catapult of a CAM ship

Aircraft ranges were constantly improving, but the Atlantic was far too large to be covered completely by land-based types. A stop-gap measure was instituted by fitting ramps to the front of some of the cargo ships known as catapult aircraft merchantmen (CAM ships), equipped with a lone expendable Hurricane fighter aircraft. When a German bomber approached, the fighter was launched off the end of the ramp with a large rocket to shoot down or drive off the German aircraft, the pilot then ditching in the water and—in the best case—recovered by ship. Nine combat launches were made, resulting in the destruction of eight Axis aircraft for the loss of one Allied pilot.

Axis aircraft, mostly Fw 200 Condors, performing shadow surveillance—tailing the convoy out of range of the convoy's guns—posed a serious risk of reporting back the convoy's course and position so that U-boats could then be directed on to the convoy. Although CAM ships and their Hurricanes did not down a great number of enemy aircraft, they were intended to deter or dispel this surveillance threat, and, in this specialized function, may have covered their cost in fewer ship losses overall.

=== Huff-Duff ===
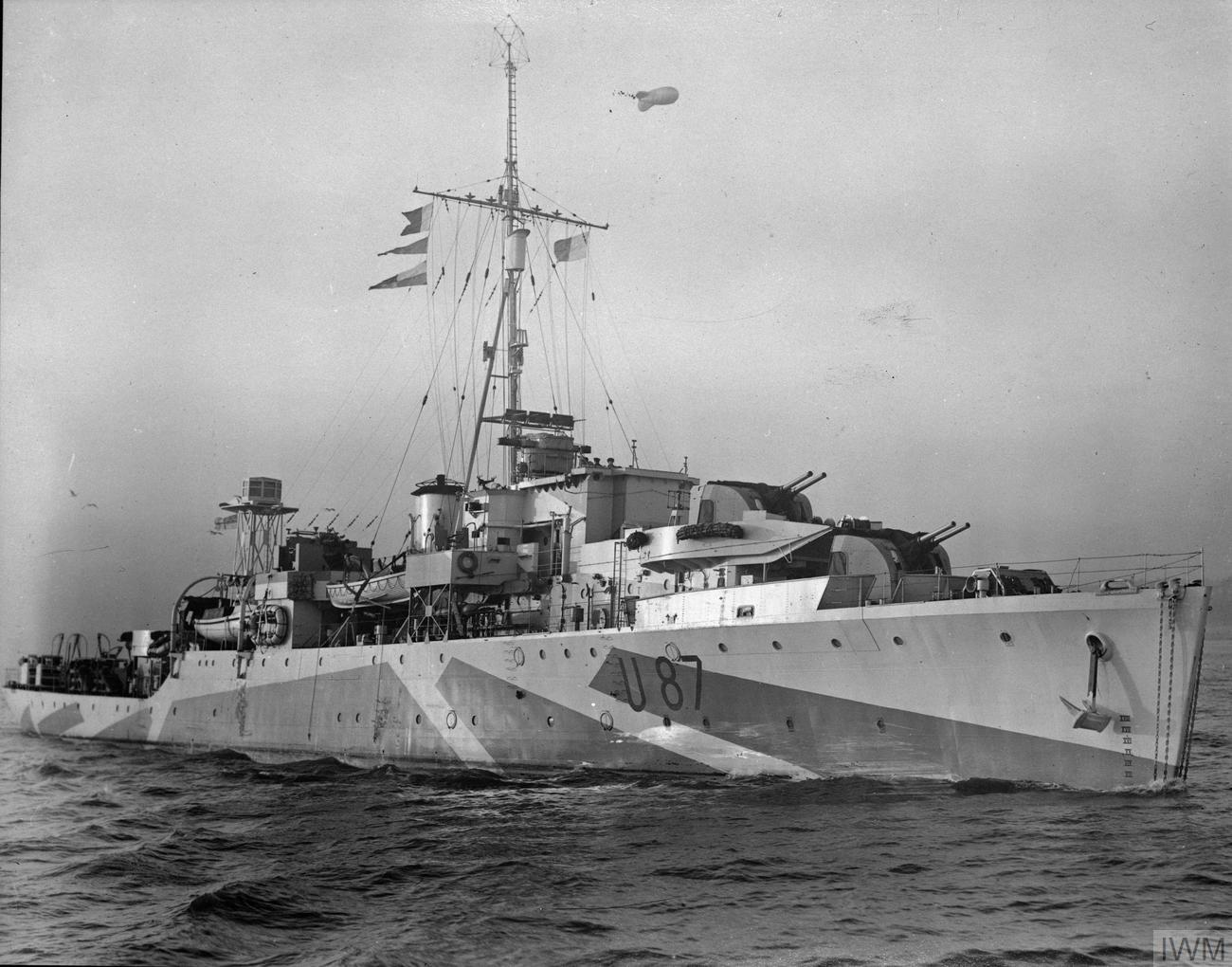
The distinctive HF/DF "birdcage" aerial can be seen at the masthead of HMS Kite

One of the more important developments was ship-borne direction-finding radio equipment, known as HF/DF (high-frequency direction-finding, or Huff-Duff), which started to be fitted to escorts from February 1942. These sets were common items of equipment by early 1943. HF/DF let an operator determine the direction of a radio signal, regardless of whether the content could be read. Since the wolf pack relied on U-boats reporting convoy positions by radio, there was a steady stream of messages to intercept. An escort could then run in the direction of the signal and attack the U-boat, or at least force it to submerge (causing it to lose contact), which might prevent an attack on the convoy. When two ships fitted with HF/DF accompanied a convoy, a fix on the transmitter's position, not just direction, could be determined. The standard approach of anti-submarine warships was immediately to "run-down" the bearing of a detected signal, hoping to spot the U-boat on the surface and make an immediate attack. Range could be estimated by an experienced operator from the signal strength. Usually, the target was found visually. If the submarine was slow to dive, the guns were used; otherwise, an ASDIC search was started where the swirl of water of a crash-diving submarine was observed. In good visibility, a U-boat might try and outrun an escort on the surface whilst out of gun range – most U-boat types had a faster maximum speed on the surface than, for instance, a Flower-class corvette, while a Black Swan-class sloop was only marginally faster.

The British also made extensive use of shore HF/DF stations to keep convoys updated with positions of U-boats. HF/DF was also installed on American ships.

The radio technology behind direction finding was simple and well understood by both sides, but the technology commonly used before the war used a manually-rotated aerial to fix the direction of the transmitter. This was delicate work, took quite a time to accomplish to any degree of accuracy, and since it only revealed the line along which the transmission originated a single set could not determine if the transmission was from the true direction or its reciprocal 180 degrees in the opposite direction. Two sets were required to fix the position. Believing this to still be the case, German U-boat radio operators considered themselves fairly safe if they kept messages short. The British developed an oscilloscope-based indicator which instantly fixed the direction and its reciprocal the moment a radio operator touched his Morse key. It worked simply with a crossed pair of conventional and fixed directional aerials, the oscilloscope display showing the relative received strength from each aerial as an elongated ellipse showing the line relative to the ship. The innovation was a 'sense' aerial, which, when switched in, suppressed the ellipse in the 'wrong' direction, leaving only the correct bearing. With this, there was hardly any need to triangulate — the escort could just run down the precise bearing provided, estimating range from the signal strength, and use look-outs or radar for final positioning. Many U-boat attacks were suppressed and submarines sunk in this way.

=== Enigma cipher ===
The way Dönitz conducted the U-boat campaign required relatively large volumes of radio traffic between U-boats and headquarters. This was thought to be safe, as the radio messages were encrypted using the Enigma cipher machine, which the Germans considered unbreakable. In addition, the Kriegsmarine used much more secure operating procedures than the Heer (Army) or Luftwaffe (Air Force). The machine's three rotors were chosen from a set of eight (rather than the other services' five). The rotors were changed every other day using a system of key sheets and the message settings were different for every message and determined from "bigram tables" that were issued to operators. In 1939, it was generally believed at the British Government Code and Cypher School at Bletchley Park that naval Enigma could not be broken. Only the head of the German Naval Section, Frank Birch, and the mathematician Alan Turing believed otherwise.

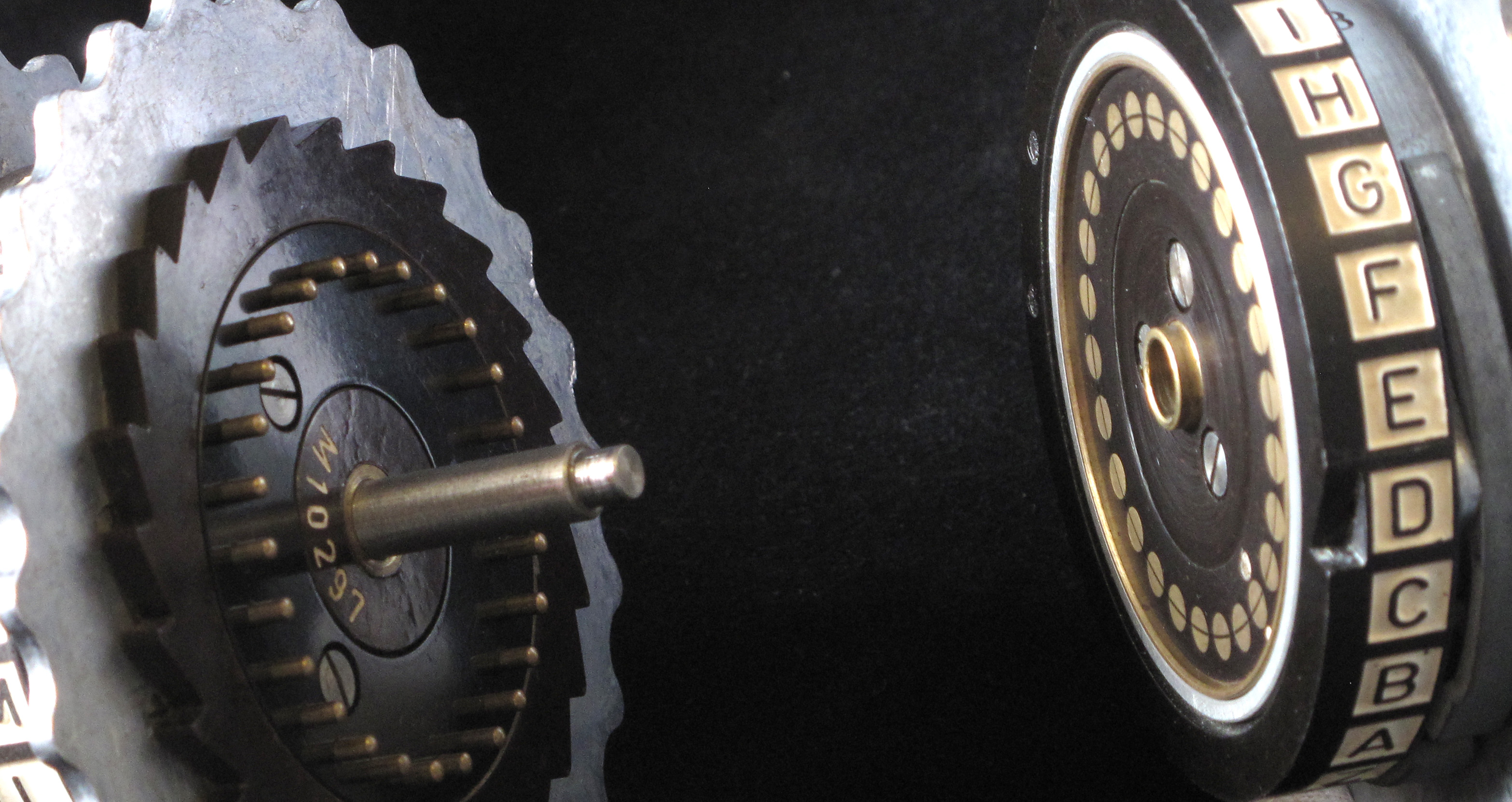
Enigma rotors and spindle

The British codebreakers needed to know the wiring of the special naval Enigma rotors. The capture of several Enigma rotors during the sinking of U-33 by HMS Gleaner (J83) in February 1940 provided this information. In early 1941, the Royal Navy made a concerted effort to assist the codebreakers, and on 9 May crew members of the destroyer Bulldog boarded U-110 and recovered cryptologic material, including bigram tables and current Enigma keys. The captured material allowed all U-boat traffic to be read for several weeks, until the keys ran out; the familiarity codebreakers gained with the usual content of messages helped in breaking new keys.

In August 1940, the British began use of their "bombe" computer which, when presented with an intercepted German Enigma message, suggested possible settings with which the Enigma cipher machine had been programmed. A reverse-engineered Enigma machine in British hands could then be programmed with each set of suggested settings in turn until the message was successfully deciphered.

Throughout late 1941, Enigma intercepts (combined with HF/DF) enabled the British to plot the positions of U-boat patrol lines and route convoys around them. Merchant ship losses dropped by over two-thirds in July 1941, and losses remained low until November.

This Allied advantage was offset by the growing numbers of U-boats coming into service. The Type VIIC began reaching the Atlantic in large numbers in 1941; by the end of 1945, 568 had been commissioned. Although the Allies could protect their convoys in late 1941, they were not sinking many U-boats. The Flower-class corvette escorts could detect and defend, but were not fast enough to attack effectively.

=== U-boat captured by an aircraft ===
A Coastal Command Hudson of No. 269 Squadron RAF captured U-570 on 27 August 1941 about 80 miles (130 km) south of Iceland. Squadron Leader J. Thompson sighted the U-boat on the surface, immediately dived at his target, and released four depth charges as the submarine crash dived. The U-boat surfaced again, crewmen appeared on deck, and Thompson engaged them with his aircraft's guns. The crewmen returned to the conning tower under fire. A few moments later, a white flag and a similarly coloured board were displayed. Thompson called for assistance and circled the German vessel. A Catalina from 209 Squadron took over watching the damaged U-boat until the arrival of the armed trawler Kingston Agate under Lt Henry Owen L'Estrange. The following day the U-boat was beached in an Icelandic cove. No codes or secret papers were recovered, but the British now possessed a complete U-boat. After a refit, U-570 was commissioned into the Royal Navy as HMS Graph.

=== Mediterranean ===
In October 1941, Hitler ordered Dönitz to move U-boats into the Mediterranean Sea to support German operations in that theatre. The resulting concentration near Gibraltar produced a series of battles around the Gibraltar and Sierra Leone convoys. In December 1941, Convoy HG 76 sailed, escorted by the 36th Escort Group of two sloops and six corvettes under Captain Frederic John Walker, reinforced by the first of the new escort carriers, HMS Audacity, and three destroyers from Gibraltar. The convoy was immediately intercepted by the waiting U-boat pack, resulting in a brutal five-day battle. Walker was a tactical innovator and his ships' crews were highly trained. The presence of an escort carrier meant U-boats were frequently sighted and forced to dive before they could get close to the convoy, at least until Audacity was sunk after two days. The five-day battle cost the Germans five U-boats (four sunk by Walker's group), while the British lost Audacity, a destroyer, and only two merchant ships. The battle was the first clear Allied convoy victory.

Through dogged effort, the Allies slowly gained the upper hand until the end of 1941. Although Allied warships failed to sink U-boats in large numbers, most convoys evaded attack completely. Shipping losses were high, but manageable.

== January–June 1942 ==
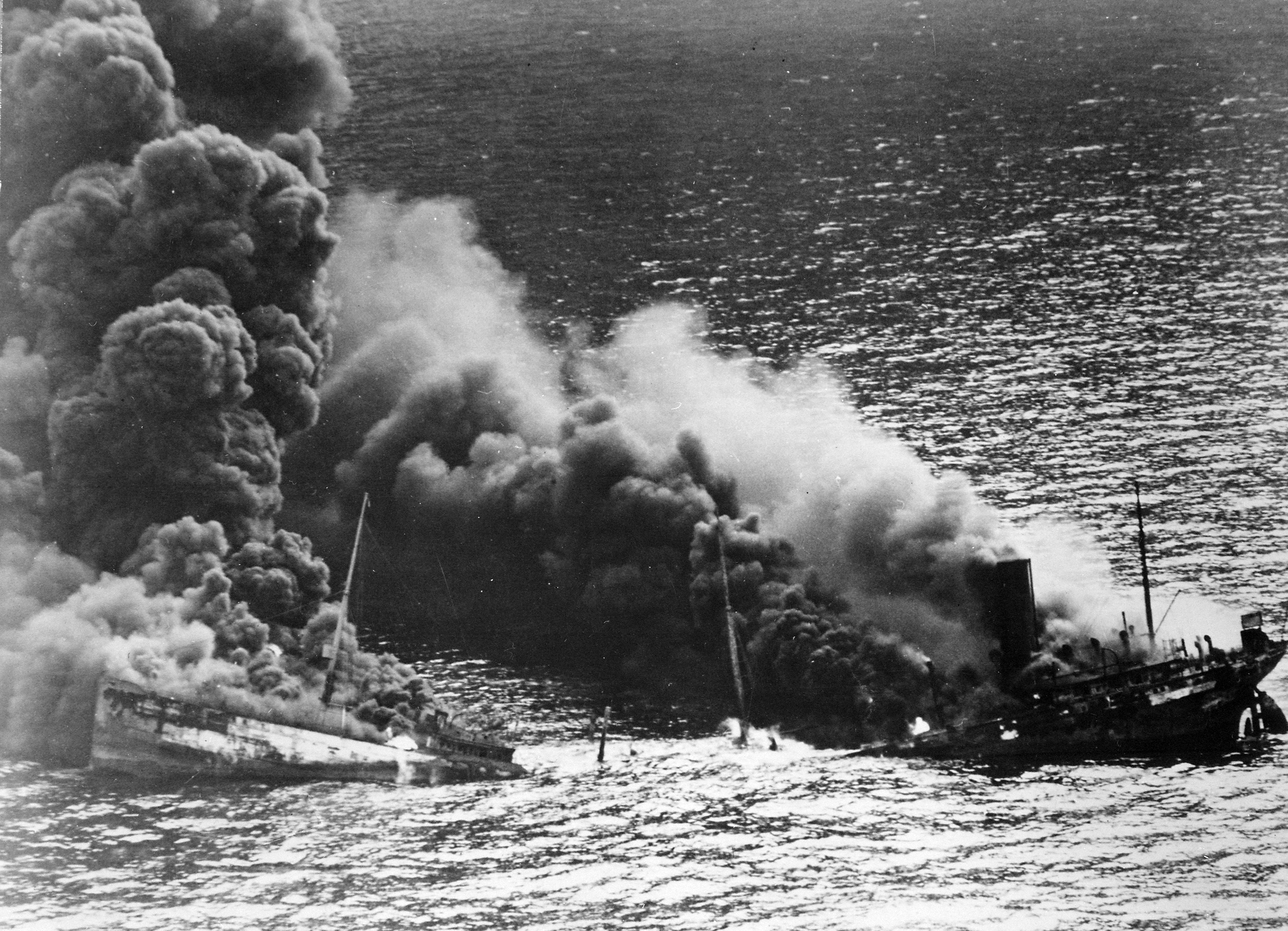
Allied tanker Dixie Arrow, torpedoed by U-71, in 1942

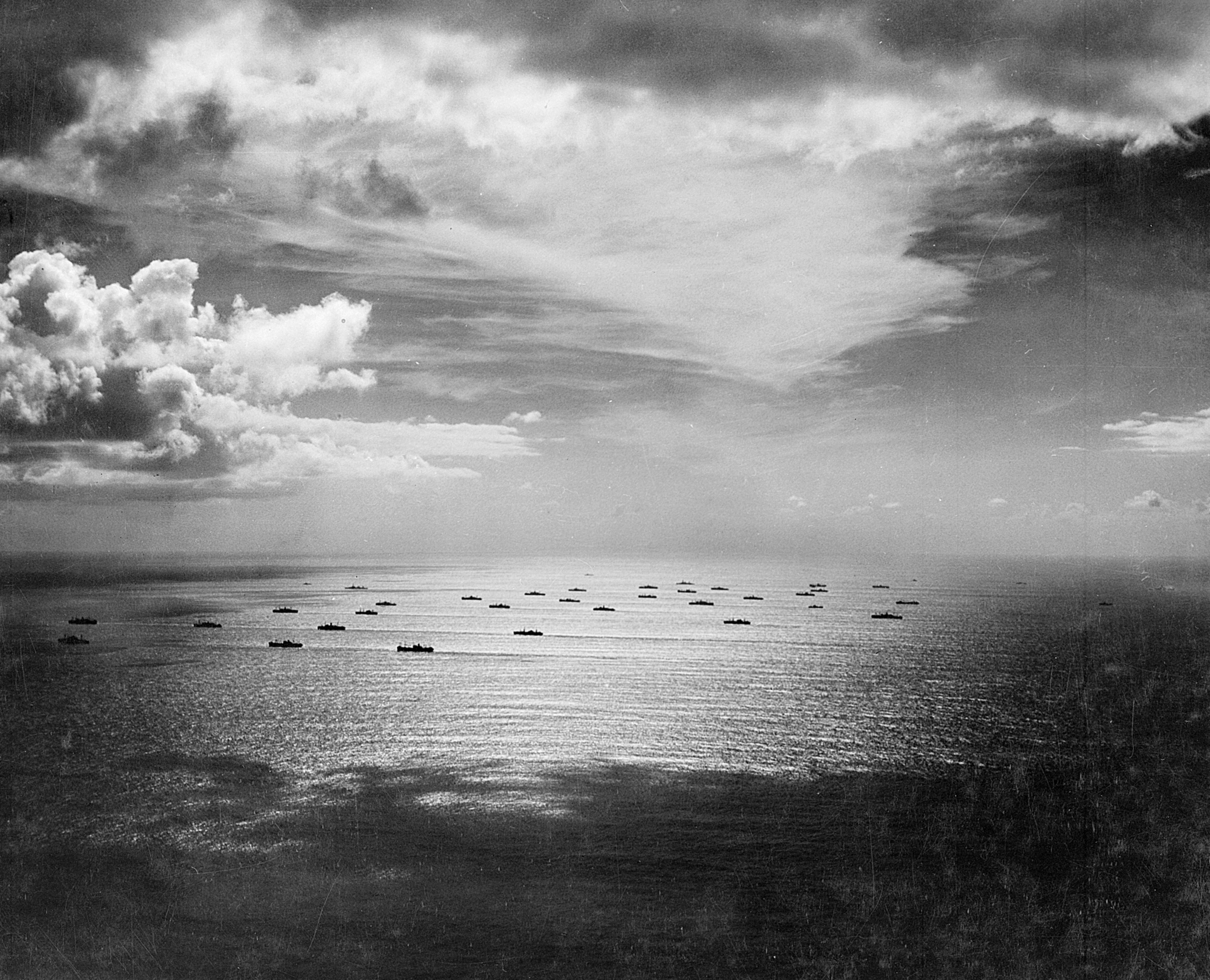
An Allied convoy heads eastward across the Atlantic, bound for Casablanca, in November 1942

The attack on Pearl Harbor and the subsequent German declaration of war on the United States had an immediate effect on the campaign. Dönitz planned to attack shipping off the American East Coast. He had only five Type IX boats able to reach US waters for Operation Drumbeat (Paukenschlag), sometimes called the "second happy time" by the Germans.

The US, having no direct experience of modern naval war on its own shores, did not employ a blackout. U-boats stood off shore at night and picked out ships silhouetted against city lights. Admiral Ernest King, Commander-in-Chief United States Fleet (Cominch), who disliked the British, initially rejected Royal Navy calls for a coastal blackout or convoy system. King has been criticised for this decision, but his defenders argue the US destroyer fleet was limited (partly because of the sale of 50 old destroyers to Britain earlier in the war), and King claimed it was far more important that destroyers protect Allied troop transports than merchant shipping. His ships were also busy convoying Lend-Lease material to the Soviet Union, as well as fighting the Japanese in the Pacific. King could not require coastal blackouts—the Army had legal authority over all civil defence— and did not follow advice the Royal Navy (or Royal Canadian Navy) provided that even unescorted convoys would be safer than merchants sailing individually. No troop transports were lost, but merchant ships sailing in US waters were left exposed and suffered accordingly. Britain eventually had to build coastal escorts and provide them to the US in a "reverse Lend Lease", since King was unable (or unwilling) to make any provision himself.

The first U-boats reached US waters on 13 January 1942. By the time they withdrew on 6 February, they had sunk 156,939 tonnes of shipping without loss. The first batch of Type IXs was followed by more Type IXs and Type VIIs supported by Type XIV "Milk Cow" tankers which provided refuelling at sea. They sank 397 ships totalling over 2 million tons. In 1943, the United States launched over 11 million tons of merchant shipping; that number declined in the later war years, as priorities moved elsewhere.

In May, King (by this time both Cominch and Chief of Naval Operations (CNO) finally scraped together enough ships to institute a convoy system. This quickly led to the loss of seven U-boats. The US did not have enough ships to cover all the gaps; the U-boats continued to operate freely during the Battle of the Caribbean and throughout the Gulf of Mexico (where they effectively closed several US ports), until July, when the British-loaned escorts began arriving. These included 24 anti-submarine armed trawlers. The institution of an interlocking convoy system on the American coast and in the Caribbean Sea in mid-1942 resulted in an immediate drop in attacks in those areas. As a result of the increased coastal convoy escort system, the U-boats' attention was shifted back to the Atlantic convoys. For the Allies, the situation was serious but not critical throughout much of 1942.

== July 1942 – February 1943 ==
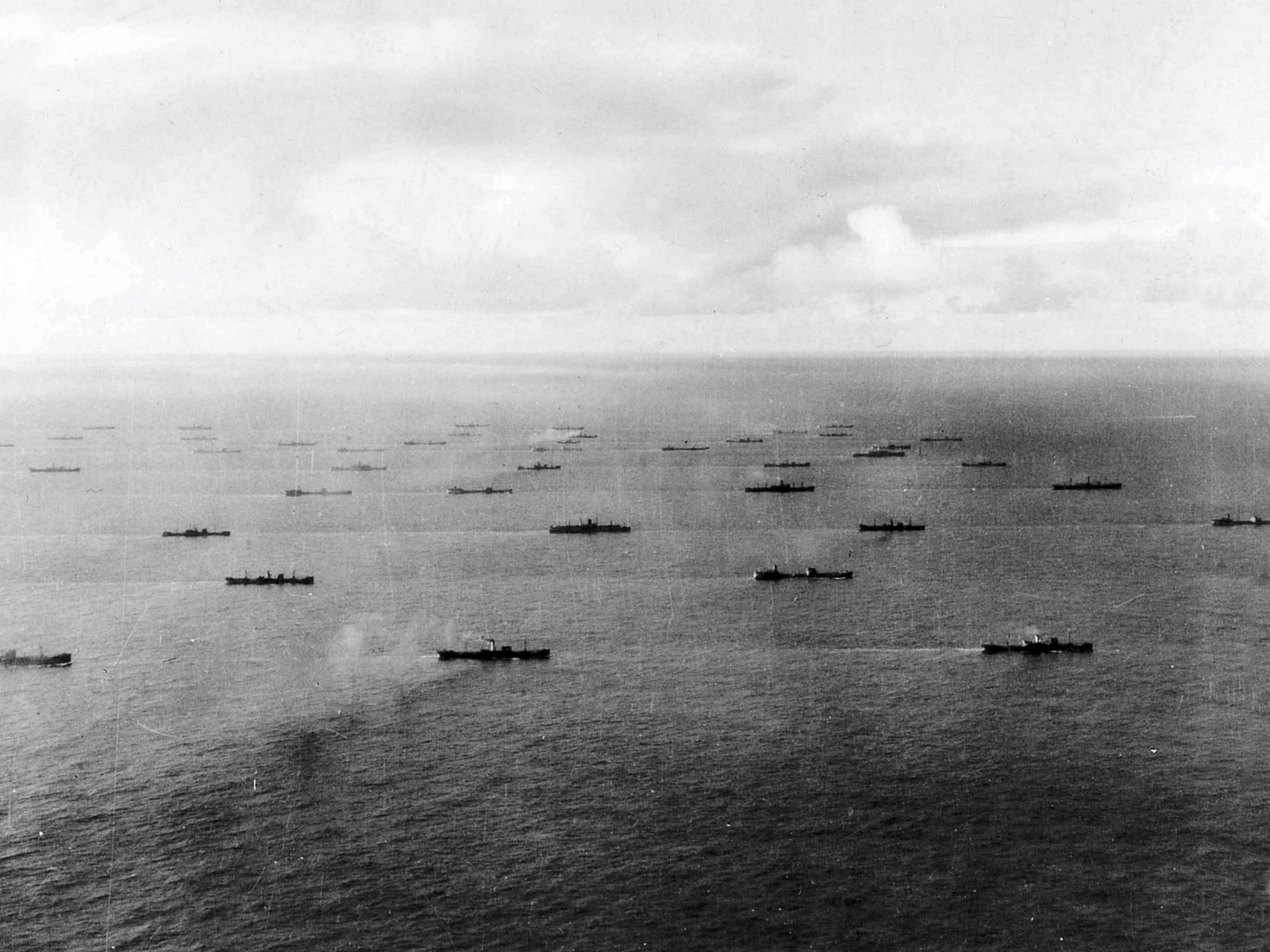
Allied convoy near Iceland, 1942

With the US finally arranging convoys in their sector of the Atlantic, ship losses to the U-boats quickly dropped, and Dönitz realised his U-boats were better used elsewhere. On 19 July 1942, he ordered the last boats to withdraw from the United States Atlantic coast; by the end of July 1942 he had shifted his attention back to the North Atlantic, where Allied aircraft could not provide cover—i.e. the Black Pit. Convoy SC 94 marked the return of the U-boats to the convoys from Canada to Britain. The command centre for the submarines operating in the West, including the Atlantic, also changed, moving to a newly constructed command bunker at the Château de Pignerolle just east of Angers on the Loire river. The headquarters was commanded by Hans-Rudolf Rösing.

There were enough U-boats spread across the Atlantic to allow several wolf packs to attack many different convoy routes. Often as many as 10 to 15 boats would attack in one or two waves, following convoys like SC 104 and SC 107 by day and attacking at night. Convoy losses quickly increased and in October 1942, 56 ships of over 258,000 tonnes were sunk in the "air gap" between Greenland and Iceland.

U-boat losses also climbed. In the first six months of 1942, 21 were lost, less than one for every 40 merchant ships sunk. In the last six months of 1942, 66 were sunk, one for every 10 merchant ships, almost as many as in the previous two years together.

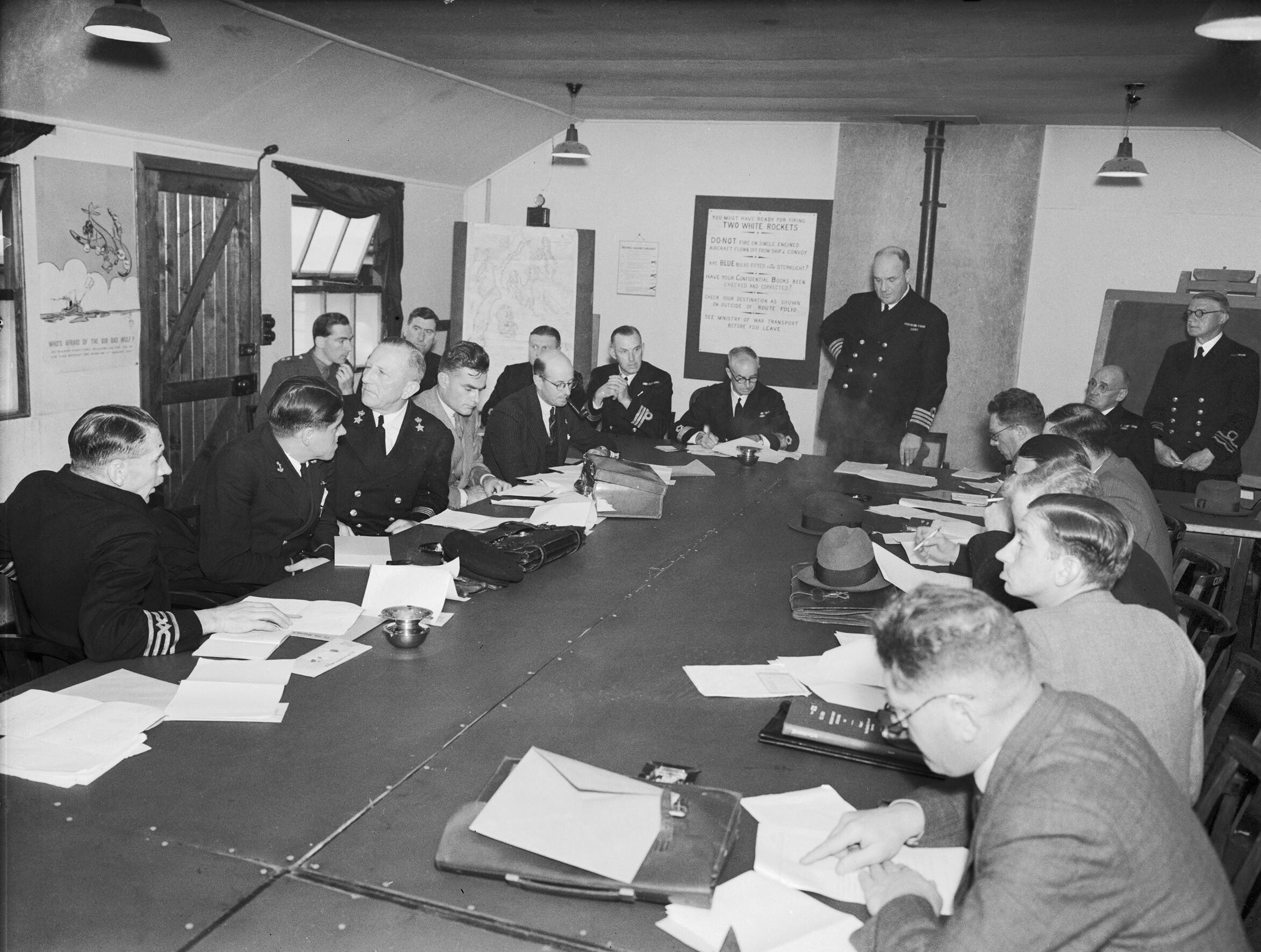
A convoy conference in progress, August 1942

On 19 November 1942, Admiral Noble was replaced as Commander-in-Chief of Western Approaches Command by Admiral Sir Max Horton. Horton used the growing number of escorts becoming available to organise "support groups", to reinforce convoys that came under attack. Unlike the regular escort groups, support groups were not directly responsible for the safety of any particular convoy. This gave them much greater tactical flexibility, allowing them to detach ships to hunt submarines spotted by reconnaissance or picked up by HF/DF. Where regular escorts would have to break off and stay with their convoy, the support group ships could keep hunting a U-boat for many hours. One tactic introduced by Captain John Walker was the "hold-down", where a group of ships would patrol over a submerged U-boat until its air ran out and it was forced to the surface; this might take two or three days.

After Convoy ON 154, winter weather provided a brief respite from the fighting in January before convoys SC 118 and ON 166 in February 1943, but in the spring, convoy battles started up again with the same ferocity. There were so many U-boats on patrol in the North Atlantic, it was difficult for convoys to evade detection, resulting in a succession of vicious battles.

=== Western Approaches Tactical Unit ===
Between February 1942 and July 1945, about 5,000 naval officers played war games at Western Approaches Tactical Unit. Many game graduates believed that the battle they fought on the linoleum floor was essential to their subsequent victory at sea. In November 1942, Admiral Horton tested Beta Search in a wargame. Janet Okell and Jean Laidlaw played the role of the escorts. Five times in a row Okell and Laidlaw sank the submarine of Admiral Horton, the commander-in chief of Western Approaches.

=== Ahead-throwing weapons ===
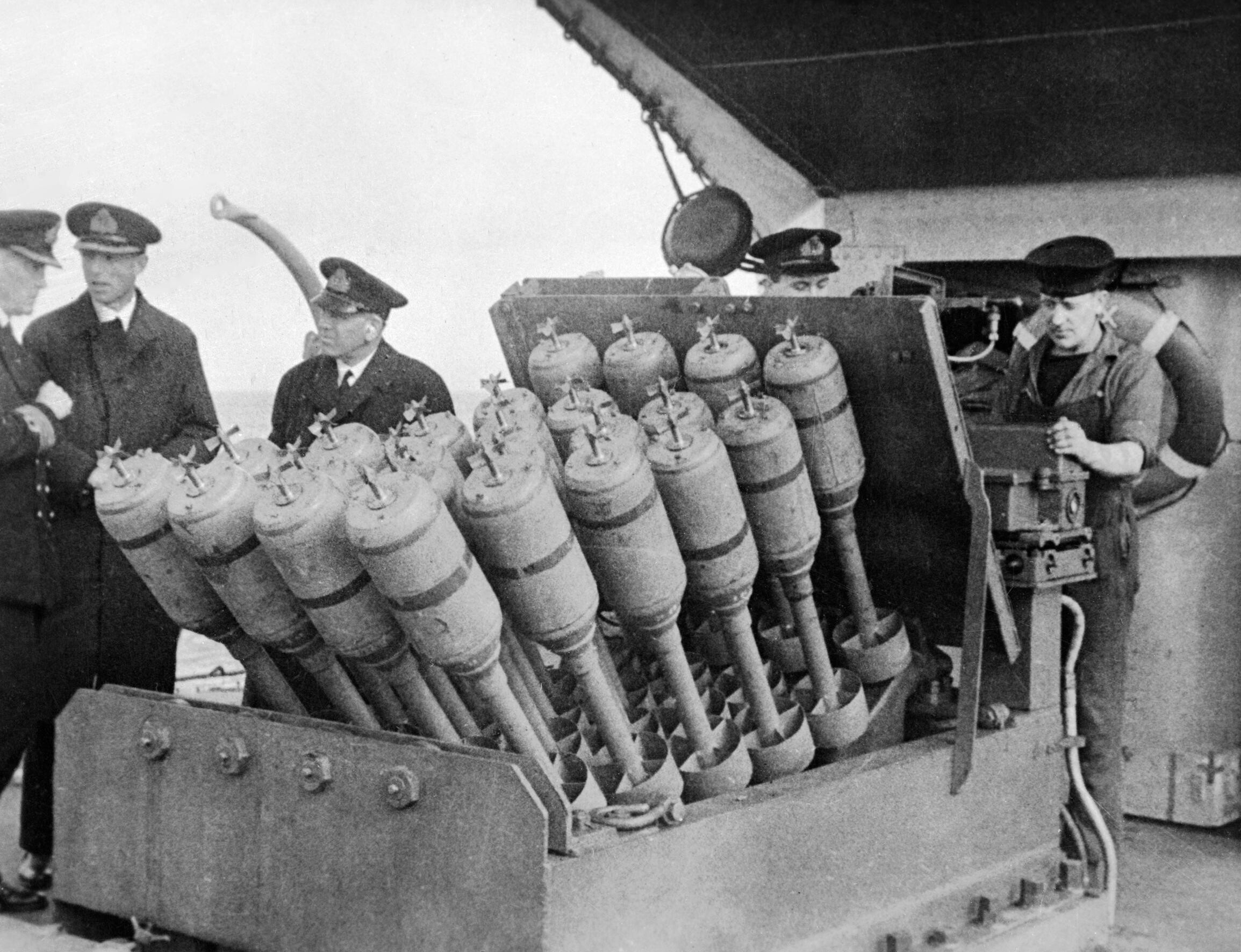
Hedgehog anti-submarine mortar mounted on the forecastle of the destroyer HMS Westcott

At the start of World War II, the depth charge was the only weapon available to a vessel for destroying a submerged submarine. Depth charges were dropped over the stern and thrown to the side of a warship travelling at speed. Early models of ASDIC/sonar searched only ahead, astern and to the sides of the vessel that was using it: there was no downward-looking capability. This caused a delay between the last fix obtained on the submarine and the warship's arrival atop that position, after which depth charges could be deployed and sink to the depth at which they set to explode. During these two delays, a capable submarine commander would manoeuvre rapidly to a different position, avoiding the explosions. The depth charges then left an area of disturbed water, through which it was difficult to regain ASDIC/sonar contact. In response to this problem, one of the solutions developed by the Royal Navy was the ahead-throwing anti-submarine weapon—the first of which was Hedgehog.

==== Hedgehog ====
Hedgehog was a multiple spigot mortar, which fired contact-fused bombs ahead of the firing ship while the target was still within the ASDIC beam. These started to be installed on anti-submarine ships from late 1942. The warship could approach slowly (as it did not have to clear the area of exploding depth charges to avoid damage) and so its position was less obvious to the submarine commander as it was making less noise. Because Hedgehog only exploded if it hit the submarine, if the target was missed, there was no disturbed water complicate tracking—and contact would not have been lost in the first place.

==== Squid ====
Introduced in late 1943, Squid improved upon Hedgehog's design. A three-barrelled mortar, it projected 100 lb (45 kg) charges ahead or abeam; the charges' firing pistols set automatically just before launch. More advanced installations linked Squid to the latest ASDIC sets so that the weapon was fired automatically.

=== Leigh Light ===
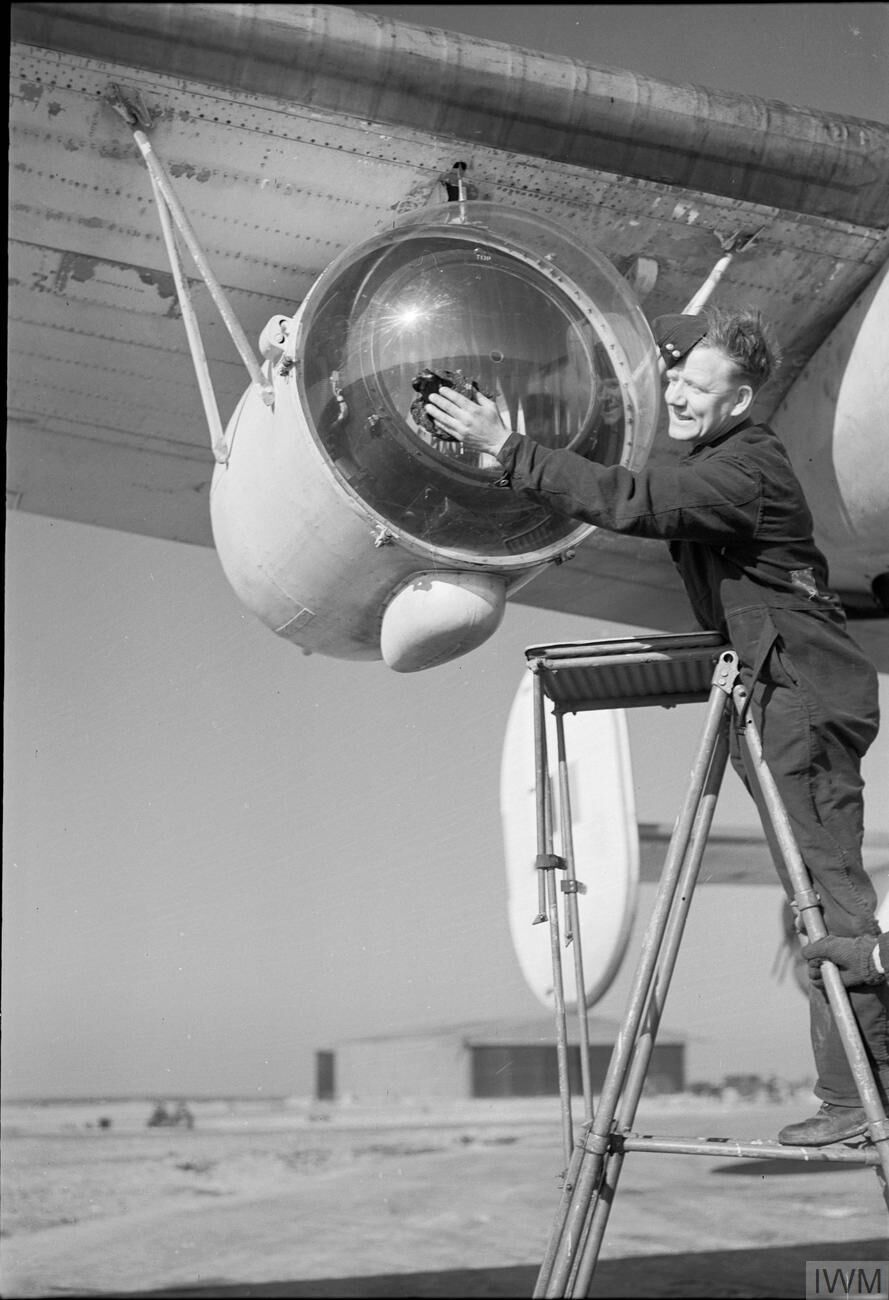
Leigh Light fitted to a Royal Air Force Coastal Command Liberator, 26 February 1944

Detection by radar-equipped aircraft could suppress U-boat activity over a wide area, but an aircraft attack could only be successful with good visibility. U-boats were relatively safe from aircraft at night for two reasons: 1) radar then in use could not detect them at less than 1 mile (1.6 km); 2) flares deployed to illuminate any attack gave adequate warning for evasive manoeuvres. The introduction of the Leigh Light by the British in January 1942 solved the second problem, thereby becoming a significant factor in the Battle for the Atlantic. Developed by RAF officer H. Leigh, it was a powerful and controllable searchlight mounted primarily to Wellington bombers and B-24 Liberators. These aircraft first located enemy submarines using air-to-surface-vessel (ASV) radar. Then, about 1 mile (1.6 km) from the target, the Leigh Light would be switched on. It immediately and accurately illuminated the enemy, giving U-boat commanders less than 25 seconds to react before they were attacked with depth charges. The first confirmed kill using this technology was U-502 on 5 July 1942.

The Leigh Light enabled the British to attack enemy subs on the surface at night, forcing German and Italian commanders to remain underwater especially when coming into port at sub bases in the Bay of Biscay. U-boat commanders who survived such attacks reported a particular fear of this weapon since aircraft could not be seen at night, and the noise of an approaching aircraft was inaudible above the sound of the sub's engines. The common practice of surfacing at night to recharge batteries and refresh air was mostly abandoned as it was safer to perform these tasks during daylight hours when enemy planes could be spotted.

=== Metox receiver ===
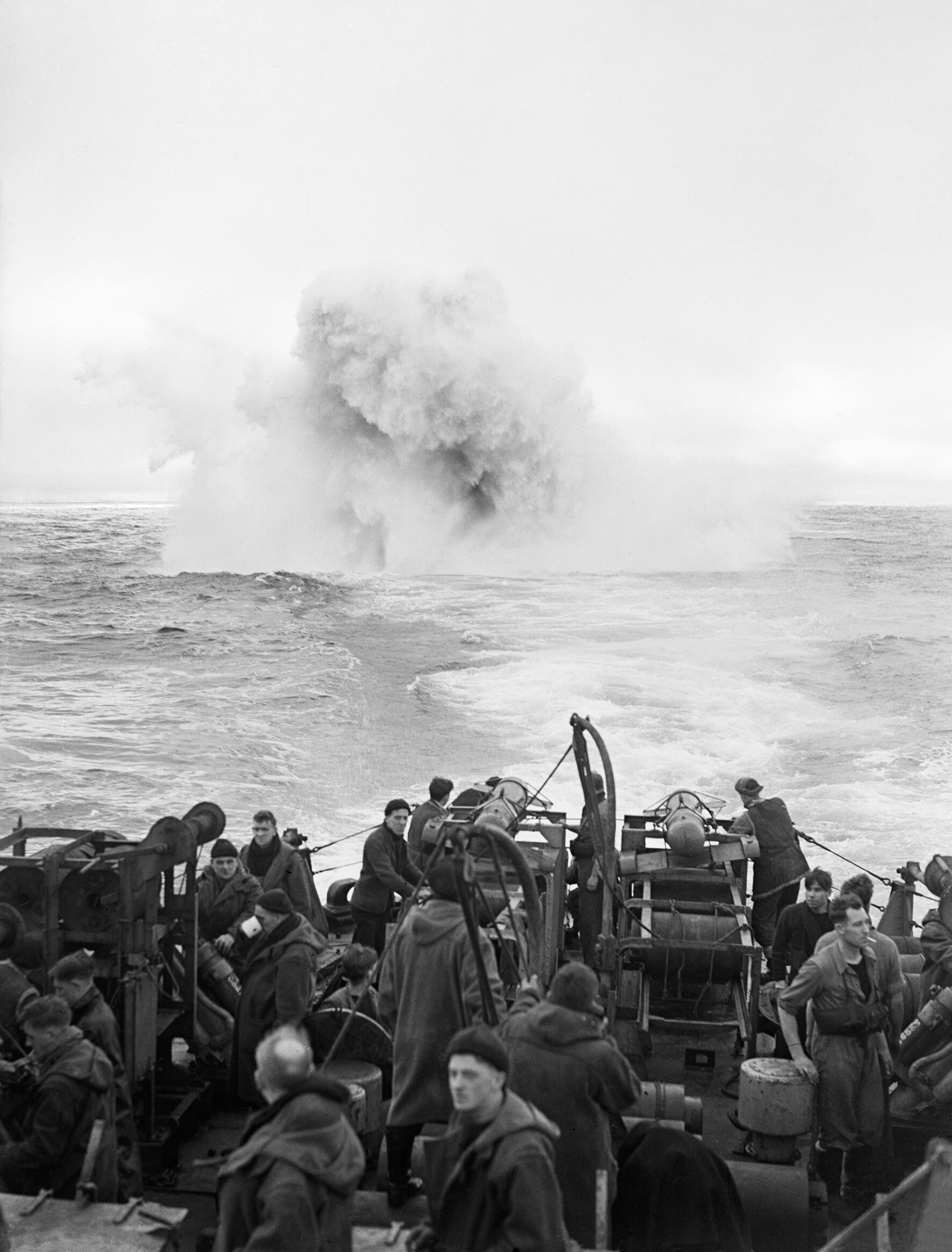
Depth charges detonate astern of the sloop HMS Starling. She participated in the sinking of 14 U-boats throughout the war

By August 1942, U-boats were being fitted with radar detectors to enable them to avoid ambushes by radar-equipped aircraft or ships. The first such receiver, named Metox after its French manufacturer, could pick up the metric radar bands used by early radars. This enabled U-boats to avoid detection by Canadian escorts, which were equipped with obsolete radar sets, and allowed them to track convoys where these sets were in use.

It also caused problems for the Germans, sometimes detecting stray radar emissions from distant ships or planes. This caused U-boats to submerge when they were not in danger, preventing them from recharging batteries or using their surfaced speed.

Metox provided the U-boat commander with an advantage that had not been anticipated by the British. The Metox set beeped at the pulse rate of the hunting aircraft's radar, about once per second. When the radar operator came within 9 miles (14 km) of the U-boat, he changed the range of his radar. With the change of range, the radar doubled its pulse frequency and as a result, the Metox beeping frequency also doubled, warning the commander that he had been detected and that the approaching aircraft was nine miles away.

=== B-Dienst ===
In 1941, American intelligence informed Rear Admiral John Henry Godfrey that the UK naval codes could be broken. In March 1942, the Germans broke Naval Cipher 3, used for Anglo-American communication. Eighty per cent of the Admiralty messages from March 1942 to June 1943 were read by the Germans. Sinking of Allied merchant ships increased dramatically. Günter Hessler, Admiral Dönitz's son-in-law and first staff officer at U-boat Command, said,

We had reached a stage when it took one or two days to decrypt the British radio messages. On occasions only a few hours were required. We could sometimes deduce when and how they would take advantage of the gaps in our U-boat dispositions. Our function was to close those gaps just before the convoys were due.

The code breakers of Bletchley Park assigned only two people to evaluate whether the Germans broke the code. After five months, they determined that the codes were broken. In August 1942, the Admiralty was informed, but did not change the codes until June 1943. Captain Raymond Dreyer, deputy staff signals officer at Western Approaches, the British HQ for the Battle of the Atlantic in Liverpool, said, "Some of their most successful U-boat pack attacks on our convoys were based on information obtained by breaking our ciphers."

=== Enigma in 1942 ===
On 1 February 1942, the Kriegsmarine switched the U-boats to a new Enigma network, TRITON, which used new, four-rotor Enigma machines. This new key could not be read by codebreakers; the Allies no longer knew where the U-boat patrol lines were. This made it far more difficult to evade contact, and wolf packs ravaged many convoys. This persisted for ten months. To obtain information on submarine movements the Allies had to make do with HF/DF fixes and decrypts of Kriegsmarine messages encoded on earlier Enigma machines. These messages included signals from coastal forces about U-boat arrivals and departures at their bases in France, and reports from the U-boat training command. From these clues, Commander Rodger Winn's Admiralty Submarine Tracking Room estimated submarine movements, but this information was not enough.

On 30 October, crewmen from HMS Petard salvaged Enigma material from German submarine U-559 as she foundered off Port Said. This allowed codebreakers to break TRITON. By December 1942, Enigma decrypts were again disclosing U-boat patrol positions, and shipping losses declined dramatically once more.

== March–May 1943 ==
On 10 March 1943, the Germans added a refinement to the U-boat Enigma key, blinding Allied code breakers at Bletchley Park for 9 days. That month saw the battles of convoys Convoy UGS 6, Convoy HX 228, Convoy SC 121, Convoys HX 229/SC 122; 120 ships were sunk, 82 ships of 476,000 GRT in the Atlantic, while 12 U-boats were destroyed.

The supply situation in Britain was such that there was talk of being unable to continue the war, with supplies of fuel being particularly low. The situation was so bad that the British considered abandoning convoys entirely. The next two months saw a complete reversal of fortunes.

In April, losses of U-boats increased and their kills fell significantly. Only 39 ships of 235,000 tons were sunk in the Atlantic, and 15 U-boats were destroyed. By May, wolf packs no longer had the advantage and that month became known as Black May in the U-boat Arm (U-Bootwaffe). The turning point was the battle centred on slow convoy ONS 5 (April–May 1943). Made up of 43 merchantmen escorted by 16 warships, it was attacked by a pack of 30 U-boats. Although 13 merchant ships were lost, six U-boats were sunk by the escorts or Allied aircraft. Despite a storm which scattered the convoy, the merchantmen reached the protection of land-based air cover, causing Dönitz to call off the attack. Two weeks later, SC 130 saw at least three U-boats destroyed and at least one U-boat damaged for no losses. Faced with disaster, Dönitz called off operations in the North Atlantic, admitting "We had lost the Battle of the Atlantic".

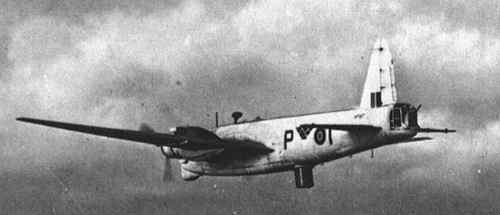
A Vickers Wellington equipped with an ASV III radar under the chin and a Leigh light under the belly

On 13 April RAF Coastal Command started its second Bay Offensive with operation Derange. Seventy-five long range aircraft equipped with the new centrimetric ASV Mark III radar with PPI display patrolled regions in the Bay of Biscay with known concentrations (through Enigma decrypts) of U-boats in transit. The German Metox radar detector operated only in the metric band and did not detect the new centrimetric radar emissions. As a result, many U-boats were surprised and attacked. In response Dönitz ordered U-boats to stay on the surface and directly combat aircraft. Some U-boats were converted to "flak boats" with extra and new anti-aircraft guns, but to no avail: In May five U-boats were sunk and another seven forced to abort.

In all, 43 U-boats were destroyed in May, 34 in the Atlantic. This comprised 25% of the U-boat Arm's total operational strength. The Allies lost 58 ships in the same period, 34 of these (totalling 134,000 tons) in the Atlantic.

=== Convergence of technologies ===
The Battle of the Atlantic was won by the Allies in two months. There was no single reason for this; what had changed was a sudden convergence of technologies, combined with an increase in Allied resources. The mid-Atlantic gap that had been unreachable by aircraft was closed by long-range B-24 Liberators. On 18 March 1943, Roosevelt ordered King to transfer 60 Liberators from the Pacific theatre to the Atlantic to combat German U-boats; one of only two direct orders he gave to his military commanders in WWII (the other was regarding Operation Torch). At the May 1943 Trident conference, Admiral King requested General Henry H. Arnold to send a squadron of ASW-configured B-24s to Newfoundland to strengthen the air escort of North Atlantic convoys. General Arnold ordered his squadron commander to engage only in "offensive" search and attack missions and not in the escort of convoys. In June, General Arnold suggested the Navy assume responsibility for ASW operations. Admiral King requested the Army's ASW-configured B-24s in exchange for an equal number of unmodified Navy B-24s. Agreement was reached in July and the exchange was completed in September 1943.

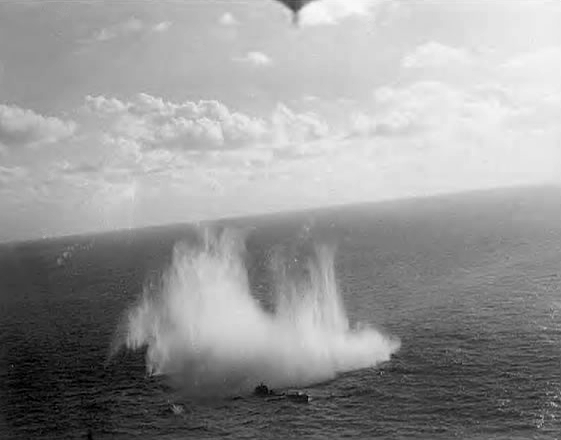
U-507, under attack by a US Navy Consolidated PBY-5A Catalina of Patrol Squadron VP-83 off the northern coast of Brazil in the South Atlantic.

Further air cover was provided by the introduction of merchant aircraft carriers (MAC ships), which carried Fairey Swordfish, and although these Swordfish did not manage to score a U-boat kill, their presence deterred or drove off U-boat attacks as well as raising the morale of the merchant marine. Soon there were growing numbers of American-built escort carriers, primarily flying Grumman F4F Wildcats and Grumman TBF Avengers. Both types of carriers sailed with the convoys and provided much-needed air cover and patrols all the way across the Atlantic, plus escort carriers often formed hunter-killer groups not tied to a convoy getting them the freedom to seek out U-boats.

Larger numbers of escorts became available, both as a result of American building programmes and the release of escorts committed to the North African landings during November and December 1942. In particular, destroyer escorts (DEs) (similar British ships were known as frigates) were designed to be built economically, compared to fleet destroyers and sloops whose warship-standards construction and sophisticated armaments made them too expensive for mass production. Destroyer escorts and frigates were also better designed for mid-ocean anti-submarine warfare than corvettes, which, although maneuverable and seaworthy, were too short, slow, and inadequately armed to match the DEs. Not only would there be sufficient numbers of escorts to securely protect convoys, they could also form hunter-killer groups (often centered on escort carriers) to aggressively hunt U-boats.

During May 1943, the US Navy began using a high-speed bombe of its own design which could deduce the settings of the new four-rotor German Enigma cipher machines. By September 1944, 121 of the new high-speed bombes were at work.

Dönitz's aim in this tonnage war was to sink Allied ships faster than they could be replaced; as losses fell and production rose, particularly in the United States, this became impossible.

== May 1942 – September 1943 ==
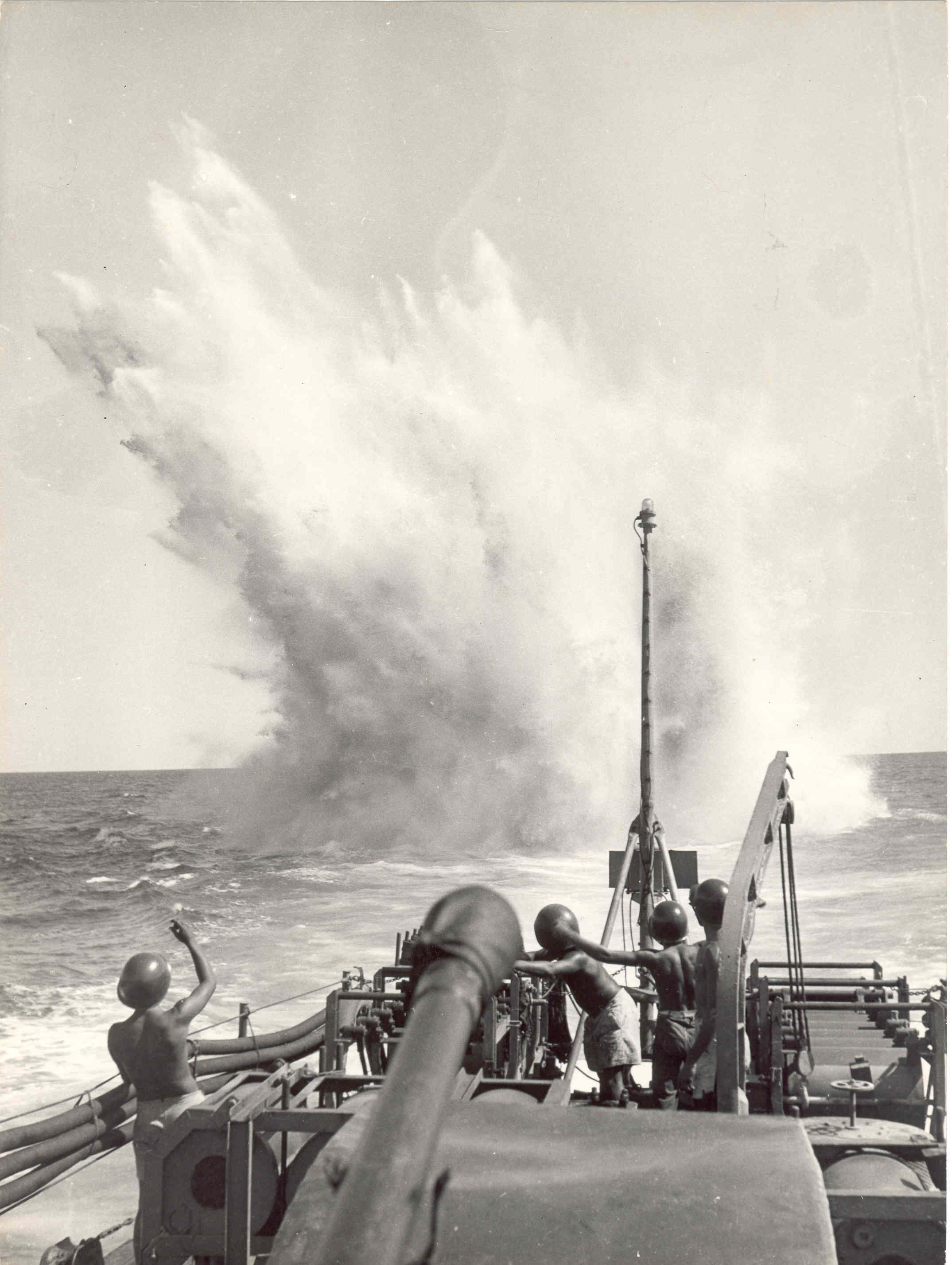
Brazilian Navy on anti-submarine warfare in the South Atlantic, 1944.

Despite U-boat operations in the region (centred in the Atlantic Narrows between Brazil and West Africa) beginning late 1940, only in the following year did these start to raise serious concern in Washington. This perceived threat caused the US to consider the introduction of her forces along Brazil's coast. After negotiations with Brazilian Foreign Minister Osvaldo Aranha (on behalf of dictator Getúlio Vargas), this was achieved in the second half of 1941.

Germany and Italy subsequently extended their submarine attacks to include Brazilian ships wherever they were, and from April 1942 were found in Brazilian waters. On 22 May 1942, the first Brazilian attack (although unsuccessful) was carried out by Brazilian Air Force aircraft on the Italian submarine Barbarigo. After a series of attacks on merchant vessels off the Brazilian coast by U-507, Brazil officially entered the war on 22 August 1942, offering an important addition to the Allied strategic position in the South Atlantic.

Although the Brazilian Navy was small, it had modern minelayers suitable for coastal convoy escort. Brazilian Air Force aircraft only needed small modifications to become suitable for maritime patrol. During their three years of war, mainly in Caribbean and South Atlantic, alone and in conjunction with the US, Brazil escorted 3,167 ships in 614 convoys, totalling 16,500,000 tons, with losses of 0.1%. Nine hundred and seventy-two seamen and civilian passengers were lost aboard the 32 Brazilian merchant vessels attacked by enemy submarines. American and Brazilian air and naval forces worked closely together until the end of the Battle. One example was the sinking of U-199 in July 1943, by a coordinated action of Brazilian and American aircraft. In Brazilian waters, eleven other Axis submarines were known to be sunk between January and September 1943—the Italian Archimede and ten German boats: U-128, U-161, U-164, U-507, U-513, U-590, U-591, U-598, U-604, and U-662.

By late 1943, the decreasing number of Allied shipping losses in the South Atlantic coincided with the increasing elimination of Axis submarines operating there. From then on, the battle in the region was lost by Germany, even though most of the remaining submarines in the region received an official order of withdrawal only in August 1944, and with the last Allied merchant ship, Baron Jedburgh, sunk by U-532 on 10 March 1945.

== June 1943 – May 1945 ==
After the defeat on the North Atlantic convoy lanes, it became clear to Dönitz and Hitler that a new generation of U-boats was urgently needed. There was a programme to develop Walter U-boats which achieved high underwater speeds with a revolutionary hydrogen peroxide air-independent propellant system, but it faced many technical setbacks and these U-boats would not become available in time. Instead it was decided to modify these designs where the new propulsion system was replaced with much larger battery capacity for a conventional U-boat propulsion system, the Elektroboot types. Since the design was ready, it was hoped that by mass-producing the U-boat in prefabricated sections, these new Type XXI oceangoing and coastal Type XXIII would become operational in mid-1944. In the meantime, as a stopgap measure until these Elektroboote became available, the existing U-boat designs were gradually equipped with a Schnorchel (snorkel), which allowed U-boats to run their diesel engines whilst submerged and recharge their batteries.

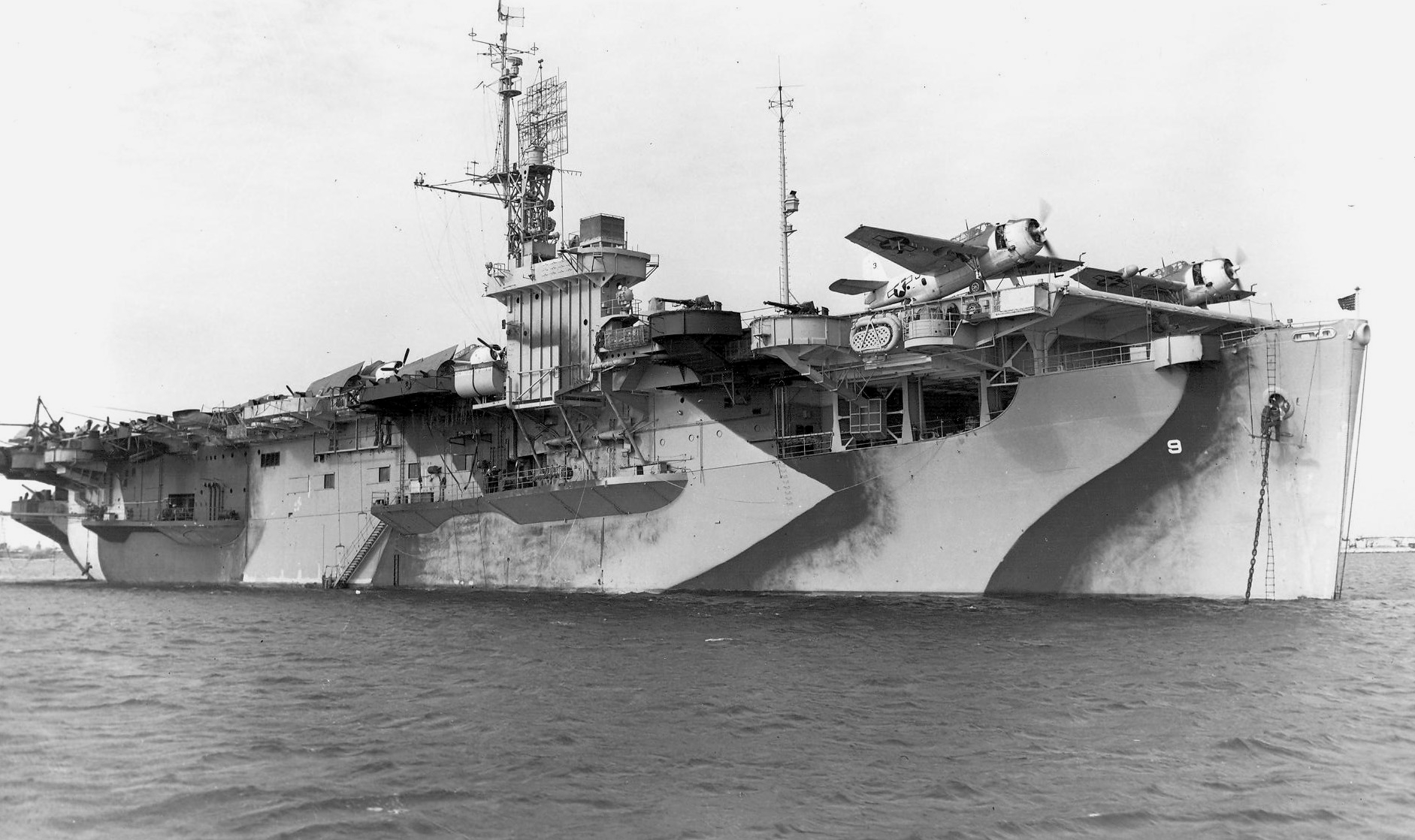
The escort carrier USS Bogue

The U-boats left the North Atlantic convoy lanes and shifted their attacks to the American-Mediterranean convoys in the Central Atlantic. The Allies learned from this move through intelligence and anticipated by ordering three US Navy task Groups centred around the escort carriers Card, Bogue and Santee to the region. These escort carriers protected the convoys, but were not part of its close escort and were allowed to search and destroy U-boats and their supporting U-boat tankers on HF/DF bearings. Only 1 ship was lost, but the escort carriers sank 17 U-boats. After this defeat, Dönitz halted all wolfpack operations in the beginning of August until U-boats could be upgraded with better weapons and measures. At the same time the British were allowed to access the harbours at the Portuguese Azores Islands and to operate Allied military aircraft based in the Azores, which closed the air gap in the Mid-Atlantic and made operations there equally hazardous. From June to September 1943 Coastal Command kept up its Bay offensive with operations Musketry, Seaslug and Percussion. By the first week of August 1941 U-boats were sunk in the Bay of Biscay. The Bay offensive was intensified by sending escort and support groups into the Bay but these ships were driven off by German Dornier Do 217 aircraft armed with Henschel Hs 293 guided glide bomb, which claimed several victims.

In September 1943 Dönitz hoped to surprise the Allies by sending the Wolfpack Leuthen back to the North Atlantic convoy lanes. These U-boats were equipped with T5 "Zaunkönig" acoustic torpedoes, better anti-aircraft guns, a new "Wanze" radar detector and "Afrodite" radar decoys. In an adaptation of their wolfpack tactics, they were ordered first to attack convoy escorts with their acoustic torpedoes before attacking the merchant ships. The group achieved surprise and success in its first attack on convoys ONS 18 and ON 202, but all subsequent attacks were beaten off with heavy loss for the Germans. Other wolfpacks Rossbach, Schlieffen and Siegfried were formed and kept the new campaign going but could achieve little for heavy losses. Only eight ships of 56,000 tons and six warships had been sunk for the loss of 39 U-boats, a catastrophic loss ratio. In November Dönitz finally recognized wolfpack attacks were not viable anymore in the face of heavy convoy escort and dispersed his U-boats.

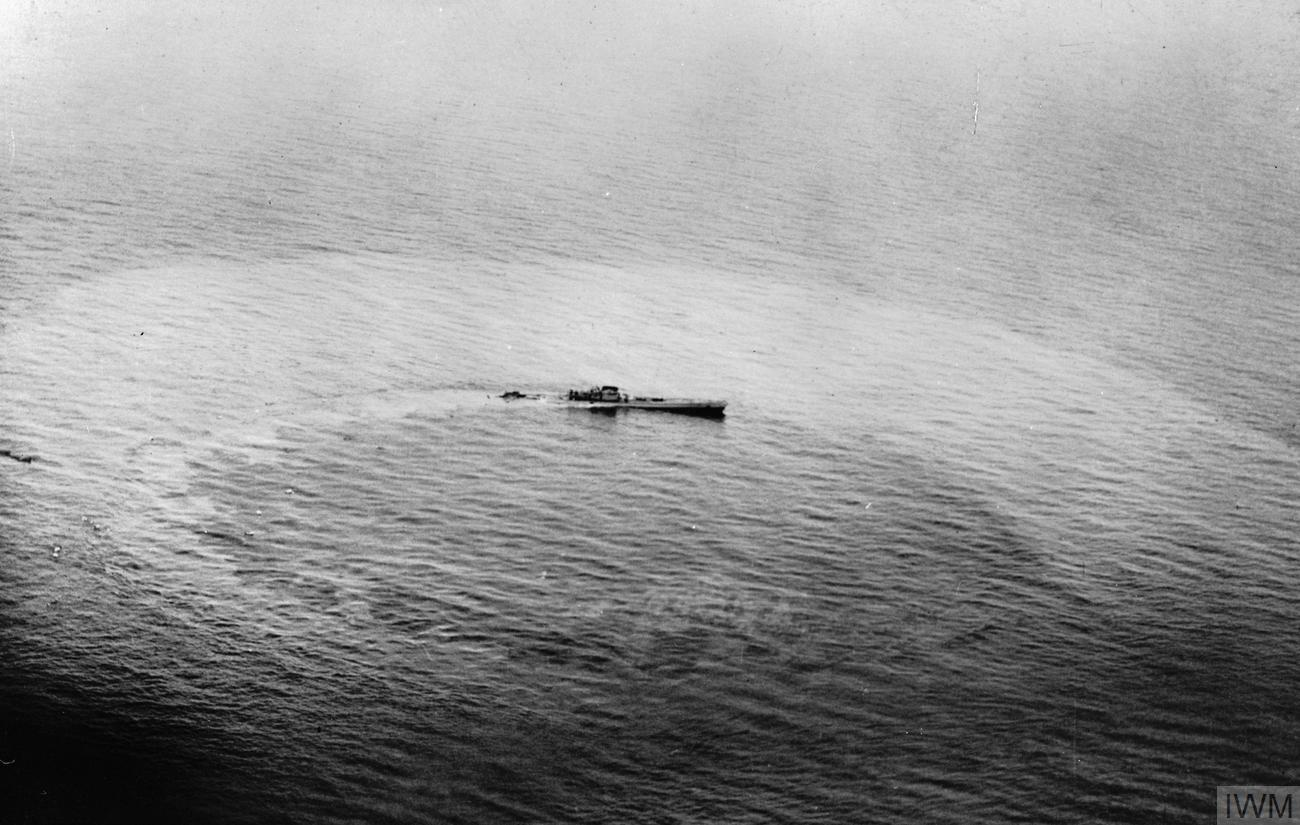
U-459, a Type XIV supply submarine (known as a "milch cow") sinking after being attacked by a Vickers Wellington

From January 1944 onwards, Dönitz tried to preserve his U-Boat strength in order to be able to repel an expected invasion in both Norway and France. The number of patrols by his Atlantic U-boats fell from 41 in January to 10 in May. Since U-boats were still diverted to the Mediterranean or kept in reserve in Norway and since operational losses were high, the number of available U-boats in the Atlantic force sank in the same period from 121 to 89. Dönitz had hoped the elektroboote could pick up the offensive on the convoy lanes again in 1944, but the construction of these boats was delayed by shortages of skilled workers and Allied bombing on shipyards and U-boat engine factories. Only in April 1944 was the first type XXI launched and its submerged speed and diving depth proved to be inferior to the designed performance.

On D-Day, Atlantic operations were suspended and all 36 U-boats, later reinforced with another seven, were sent out to confront Operation Neptune. For the loss of thirteen of their own, these U-boats sank only eight of the 5,339 vessels participating in the invasion of Normandy. Air patrols made operations for U-boats not equipped with a schnorkel impossible and these had to be recalled. A further eleven schnorkel U-boats arrived from Norway in the second week of the invasion, but they sank only two ships for the loss of seven U-boats. With the Allied advance in France, the U-boat bases in Brest and Bordeaux were lost in August–September. The other three bases in Lorient, St-Nazaire and La Pallice were evacuated but remained in German hands until the end of the war. No operations could be mounted from these bases and the remaining 30 U-boats were evacuated to Norway. Between 16 May and 1 November 72 U-boats were lost, whilst they could only sink twelve small warships and fourteen merchant ships for 60,000 tons.

Norway was too far away from the convoy lanes to organise group attacks by the schnorkel U-boats. In order to keep up the offensive pending the arrival of the elektroboote, 68 patrols were organised from Norway towards British waters between July and December 1944. Only schnorkel Type VII U-boats could be used as Allied air superiority excluded continuous cruising on the surface. Sixteen U-boats were lost. In the same period, seventeen of the longer range type IX U-boats were sent to Canada and the Azores. These U-boats had also schnorkels, and were equipped with new technology : they had new 'Fliege' and 'Mücke' radar detectors and a new 'Hohentwiel' search radar. They sank six warships and nine merchants ships for the loss of seven U-boats.

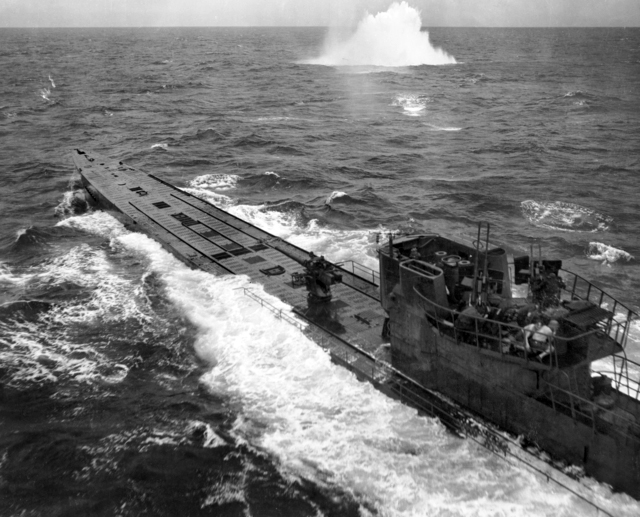
U-848 under attack by a US Navy Consolidated PB4Y-1 Liberator in November 1943

In 1945 Dönitz continued with the same approach: type VII schnorkel U-boats mounted 113 patrols to British waters from Norway and Germany. Sixty-five U-boats were lost by the end of the war. Another nineteen type IX U-boats sailed for the Americas; these U-boats sank three small warships and three merchants for the loss of nine of their own. Of the much awaited elektroboote, only five Type XXIII coastal elektroboote made seven patrols in 1945 which sank five small freighters. Only one of the big type XXI elektroboote embarked upon a patrol before the end of the war but it did not see action. In the last month of the war, many U-boats fled the Baltic ports as they were overrun by the Red Army. Eight elektroboote and nine other U-boats were sunk by Allied aircraft as they fled towards bases in Norway.

The last actions in American waters took place on 5–6 May 1945, which saw the sinking of the steamer Black Point and the destruction of U-853 and U-881 in separate incidents. The last actions of the Battle of the Atlantic were on 7–8 May. U-320 was the last U-boat sunk in action, by an RAF Catalina; while the Norwegian minesweeper NYMS 382 and the freighters Sneland I and Avondale Park were torpedoed in separate incidents, hours before the German surrender.

At the end of the war, 222 U-boats were scuttled by their crews. The remaining 174 U-boats, at sea or in port, were surrendered to the Allies. Most were destroyed in Operation Deadlight after the war, but some served in Allied navies. Six were in Japan at the time of the German surrender and were captured by the Japanese.

=== German tactical and technical changes ===
The development of torpedoes also improved with the pattern-running Flächen-Absuch-Torpedo (FAT), which ran a pre-programmed course criss-crossing the convoy path and the G7es acoustic torpedo (known to the Allies as the German Naval Acoustic Torpedo, GNAT), which homed on the propeller noise of a target. This was initially very effective, but the Allies quickly developed countermeasures, both tactical ("Step-Aside") and technical ("Foxer").

== Outcomes ==
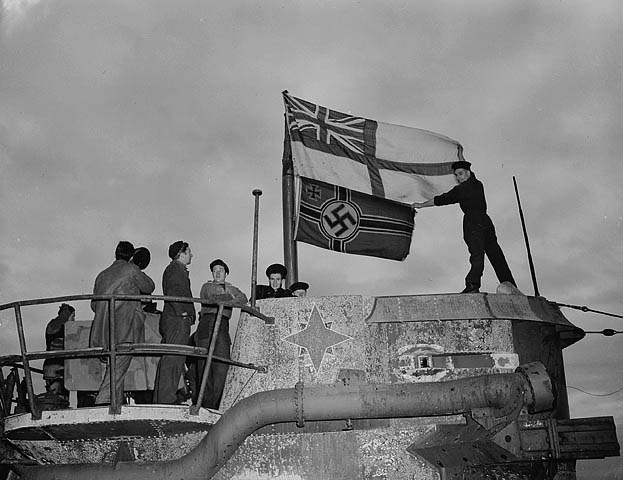
Seamen raise the White Ensign over the captured German U-boat U-190 in St. John's, Newfoundland 1945

The Germans failed to stop the flow of strategic supplies to Britain. This failure resulted in the build-up of troops and supplies needed for the D-Day landings. The defeat of the U-boat was a necessary precursor for accumulation of Allied troops and supplies to ensure Germany's defeat.

Between 1939 and 1945, 72,200 Allied naval and merchant seamen died. The Germans lost about 30,000 U-boat sailors killed, three-quarters of the 40,000-man U-boat fleet.

The Admiralty later estimated that ceding the three Treaty Ports to Ireland in 1938 led to the loss of 368 Allied ships and 5,070 lives during the war.

=== Merchant losses ===
	British Allied and neutral shipping losses by worldwide Axis Operations ( GRT )							shipping losses by German and Italian submarines (Note: Includes ships sunk by submarine laid mines)	
year	submarines	aircraft	mines	surface ships	other	total	in Atlantic	number of ships	GRT
1939	421,156	2,949	262,697	61,337	7,253	755,392	754,686	147	509,321
1940	2,156,158	580,074	509,889	511,615	203,905	3,991,641	3,654,511	520	2,462,867
1941	2,171,070	1,017,422	230,842	487,204	421,336	4,328,558	3,295,909	457	2,298,714
1942	6,266,215	700,020	104,588	396,242	323,632	7,790,697	6,150,340	1155	6,149,473
1943	2,588,906	424,411	111,658	56,986	43,177	3,225,138	2,200,410	452	2,510,304
1944	773,327	120,656	95,855	33,693	22,098	1,045,629	505,759	125	663,308
1945	283,133	44,351	93,663	10,222	7,063	438,432	366,843	63	284,476
Total	14,659,965	2,889,883	1,409,192	1,557,299	1,028,464	21,575,490	16,928,460	2919	14,878,463

German surface raider successes
raider	period	number of ships	tonnage ( GRT )
heavy cruiser Deutschland	Sep 39 - Nov 39	2	6,962
heavy cruiser Admiral Graf Spee	Sep 39 - Dec 39	9	50,089
auxiliary cruiser Atlantis	Mar 40 - Nov 41	22	145,697
auxiliary cruiser Orion	Apr 40 - Aug 41	8	48,477
auxiliary cruiser Widder	May 40- Oct 40	10	58,464
auxiliary cruiser Thor	Jun 40 - Apr 41	12	96,602
auxiliary cruiser Pinguin	Jun 40 - May 41	28	158,256
auxiliary cruiser Komet	Jul 40 - Nov 41	6	41,567
heavy cruiser Admiral Scheer	Oct 40 - Mar 41	17	113,223
heavy cruiser Admiral Hipper	Nov 40 - Dec 40	1	6,078
auxiliary cruiser Kormoran	Dec 40 - Nov 41	11	68,274
battleships Scharnhorst and Gneisenau	Jan 41 - Mar 41	22	115,622
heavy cruiser Admiral Hipper	Feb 41	8	34,042
auxiliary cruiser Thor	Nov 41 - Oct 42	10	56,037
auxiliary cruiser Michel	Mar 42 - Mar 43	14	94,363
auxiliary cruiser Stier	May 42 - Sep 42	4	30,728
auxiliary cruiser Michel	May 43 - Oct 43	3	27,632
total		187	931,116

=== Surface fleet losses ===
The German surface fleet commissioned 16 capital ships before or during the war: 4 battleships, 6 heavy cruisers and 6 light cruisers. Of these, only the Admiral Graf Spee and Bismarck were sunk in battle on the Atlantic Ocean. Three cruisers were sunk during the April 1940 invasion of Norway and Scharnhorst was sunk in the Arctic. Apart from the heavy cruiser Prinz Eugen and light cruiser Nürnberg all other ships were destroyed in port by bombers.

The British and Allied fleets fought battles all over the world and lost many ships, but only three ships were lost in battle against German surface ships : the battlecruiser Hood and the light cruisers Sydney and Charybdis.

U-boats sank 175 Allied warships in total, in all theatres of operations. Many of these were sunk in the Mediterranean or the Arctic. The adversaries of U-boats were mostly small anti-submarine ships like destroyers, destroyer escorts, frigates and corvettes, but on a few occasions U-boats could sink capital ships in the Atlantic: the battleship Royal Oak was sunk in harbour, the aircraft carrier Courageous was sunk while on anti-submarine patrol, the escort carriers Audacity, Avenger and Block Island were sunk while escorting convoys, and the light cruiser Dunedin was sunk searching for German raiders.

=== U-boat losses ===
	daily average numbers				
Period	Total fleet	Operational	Engaged in Atlantic	Sunk	new U-boats
Sep-Dec 1939	57	12	5	9	2
Jan-Mar 1940	51	11	5	6	4
Apr-Jun 1940	49	10	7	8	9
Jul-Sep 1940	56	10	8	5	15
Oct-Dec 1940	75	11	9	3	26
Jan-Mar 1941	102	20	12	5	31
Apr-Jun 1941	136	25	15	7	53
Jul-Sep 1941	182	30	17	6	70
Oct-Dec 1941	233	35	16	17	70
Jan-Mar 1942	272	45	13	11	49
Apr-Jun 1942	315	60	15	10	58
Jul-Sep 1942	352	95	25	32	61
Oct-Dec 1942	382	100	40	34	70
Jan-Mar 1943	418	110	50	40	70
Apr-Jun 1943	424	90	40	73	69
Jul-Sep 1943	408	60	20	71	68
Oct-Dec 1943	425	70	25	53	83
Jan-Mar 1944	445	65	30	60	62
Apr-Jun 1944	437	50	20	68	53
Jul-Sep 1944	396	40	15	79	50
Oct-Dec 1944	398	35	20	32	67
Jan-May 1945	349	45	20	153	93
Total				782	1133

== Merchant Navy ==
=== United Kingdom ===
During the Second World War nearly one third of the world's merchant shipping was British. Over 30,000 men from the British Merchant Navy died between 1939 and 1945. More than 2,400 British ships were sunk. The ships were crewed by sailors from all over the British Empire, including 25% from India and China, and 5% from the West Indies, Middle East and Africa. The British officers wore uniforms very similar to those of the Royal Navy. The ordinary sailors had no uniform and when on leave in Britain they sometimes suffered taunts and abuse from civilians who thought the crewmen were shirking their duty to enlist in the armed forces. To counter this, the crewmen were issued with an 'MN' lapel badge to indicate they were serving in the Merchant Navy.

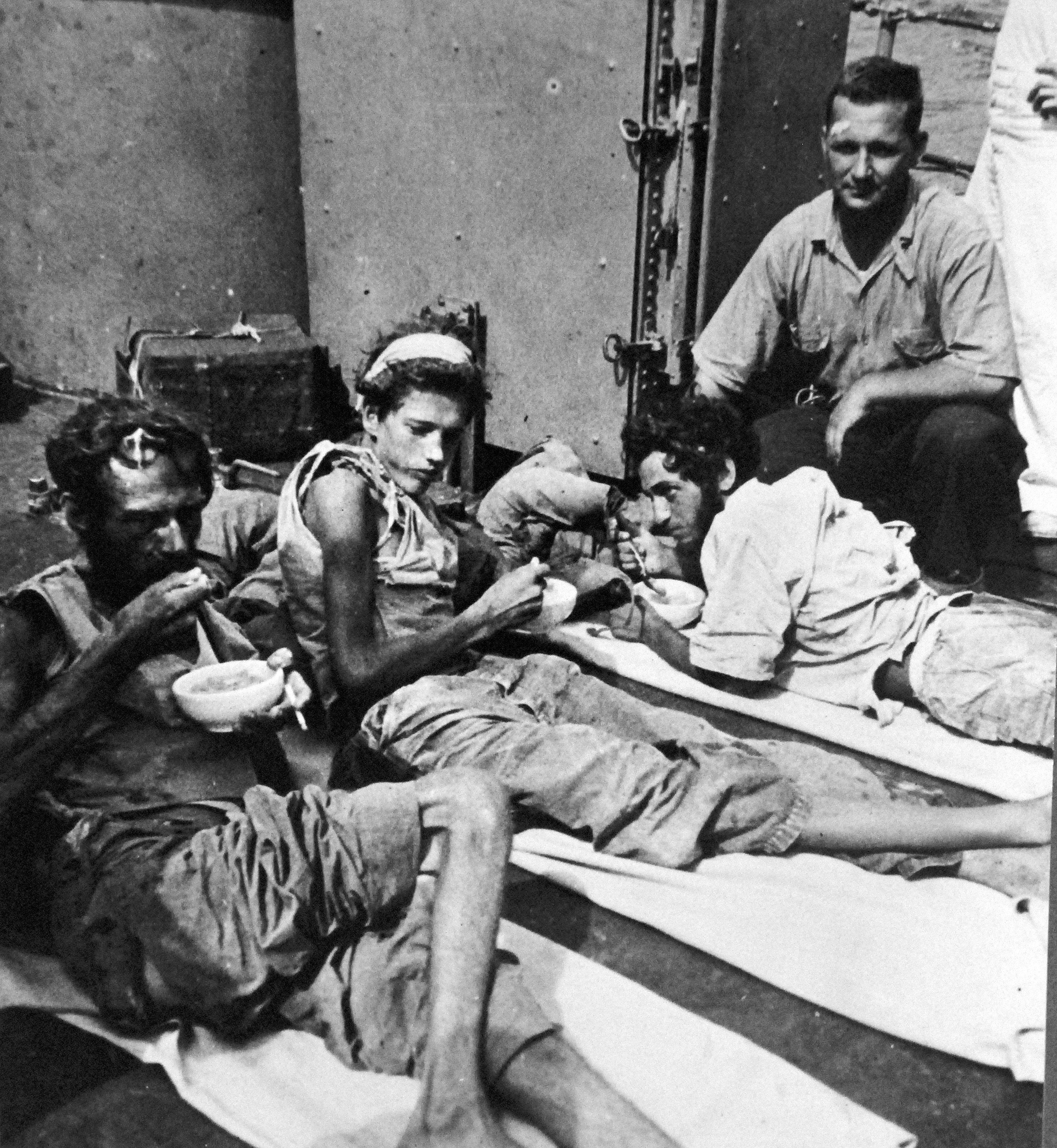
Rescued merchantmen on US Navy patrol boat after 83 days on raft, March 1943

The British merchant fleet was made up of vessels from the many and varied private shipping lines, examples being the tankers of the British Tanker Company and the freighters of Ellerman and Silver Lines. The British government, via the Ministry of War Transport (MoWT), also had new ships built during the course of the war, these being known as Empire ships.

=== United States ===
In addition to its existing merchant fleet, United States shipyards built 2,710 Liberty ships totalling 38.5 million tons, vastly exceeding the 14 million tons of shipping the German U-boats were able to sink during the war.

=== Canada ===
Information obtained by British agents regarding German shipping movements led Canada to conscript all its merchant vessels two weeks before declaring war, with the Royal Canadian Navy taking control of all shipping on 26 August 1939. At the outbreak of the war, Canada possessed 38 ocean-going merchant vessels. By the end of hostilities, in excess of 400 cargo ships had been built in Canada. More than 70 Canadian merchant vessels were lost. An estimated 1,500 merchant sailors were killed, including eight women.

At the end of the war, Rear Admiral Leonard Murray, Commander-in-Chief Canadian North Atlantic, remarked, "...the Battle of the Atlantic was not won by any Navy or Air Force, it was won by the courage, fortitude and determination of the British and Allied Merchant Navy."

=== Norway ===
Before the war, Norway's Merchant Navy was the fourth largest in the world and its ships were the most modern. The Germans and the Allies both recognised the great importance of Norway's merchant fleet, and following Germany's invasion of Norway in April 1940, both sides sought control of the ships. Norwegian Nazi puppet leader Vidkun Quisling ordered all Norwegian ships to sail to German, Italian or neutral ports. He was ignored. All Norwegian ships decided to serve at the disposal of the Allies. The vessels of the Norwegian Merchant Navy were placed under the control of the government-run Nortraship, with headquarters in London and New York.

Nortraship's modern ships, especially its tankers, were extremely important to the Allies. Norwegian tankers carried nearly one-third of the oil transported to Britain during the war. Records show that 694 Norwegian ships were sunk during this period, representing 47% of the total fleet. At the end of the war in 1945, the Norwegian merchant fleet was estimated at 1,378 ships. More than 3,700 Norwegian merchant seamen died.

== Assessment ==
G. H. Persall maintains that "the Germans were close" to economically starving England, but they "failed to capitalize" on their early war successes. Others, including Blair and Alan Levine, disagree; Levine states this is "a misperception", and that "it is doubtful they ever came close" to achieving this.

The focus on U-boat successes, the "aces" and their scores, the convoys attacked, and the ships sunk, serves to camouflage the Kriegsmarine's manifold failures. In particular, this was because most of the ships sunk by U-boats were not in convoys, but sailing alone, or having become separated from convoys.

At no time during the campaign were supply lines to Britain interrupted; even during the Bismarck crisis, convoys sailed as usual (although with heavier escorts). In all, during the Atlantic campaign only 10% of transatlantic convoys that sailed were attacked, and of those attacked only 10% on average of the ships were lost. Overall, more than 99% of all ships sailing to and from the British Isles during World War II did so successfully.

Despite their efforts, the Axis powers were unable to prevent the build-up of Allied invasion forces for the liberation of Europe. In November 1942, at the height of the Atlantic campaign, the US Navy escorted the Operation Torch invasion fleet 3,000 mi (4,800 km) across the Atlantic without hindrance, or even being detected. In 1943 and 1944 the Allies transported 3 million American and Allied servicemen across the Atlantic without significant loss. By 1945 the USN was able to wipe out a wolf-pack suspected of carrying V-weapons in the mid-Atlantic, with little difficulty.

Moreover, unlike the Allies, the Germans were never able to mount a comprehensive blockade of Britain. Nor were they able to focus their effort by targeting the most valuable cargoes, the eastbound traffic carrying war materiel. Instead they were reduced to the slow attrition of a tonnage war. To win this, the U-boat arm had to sink 300,000 GRT per month in order to overwhelm Britain's shipbuilding capacity and reduce its merchant marine strength.

In only four out of the first 27 months of the war did Germany achieve this target, and after December 1941, when Britain was joined by the US merchant marine and ship yards the target effectively doubled. As a result, the Axis needed to sink 700,000 GRT per month; as the massive expansion of the US shipbuilding industry took effect this target increased still further. The 700,000 ton target was achieved in only one month, November 1942; after May 1943 average sinkings dropped to less than one tenth of that figure. In addition, reports do not consistently emphasize an important distinction between GRT (tonnage in units of 100 cubic feet), which is not a weight, and displacement, which is. Thus sinking a ship with a GRT of 1,000, destroyed 100,000 cubic feet of enclosed space, which bore no fixed relationship to the volume or tonnage of cargo it could carry.

By the end of the war the Allies had built over 38 million tons of new shipping.

The reason for the misperception that the German blockade came close to success may be found in post-war writings by both German and British authors. Blair attributes the distortion to "propagandists" who "glorified and exaggerated the successes of German submariners", while he believes Allied writers "had their own reasons for exaggerating the peril".

Dan van der Vat suggests that, unlike the US, or Canada and Britain's other dominions, which were protected by oceanic distances, Britain was at the end of the transatlantic supply route closest to German bases; for Britain it was a lifeline. It is this which led to Churchill's concerns. Coupled with a series of major convoy battles in the space of a month, it undermined confidence in the convoy system in March 1943, to the point Britain considered abandoning it, not realising the U-boat had already effectively been defeated. These were "over-pessimistic threat assessments", Blair concludes: "At no time did the German U-boat force ever come close to winning the Battle of the Atlantic or bringing on the collapse of Great Britain".

== Shipping and U-boat sinkings each month ==
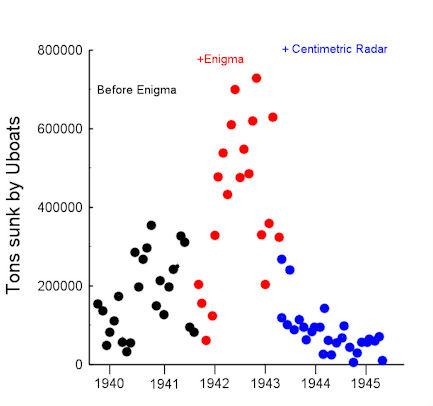
Merchant ship losses Before Enigma + Enigma + Centimetric radar

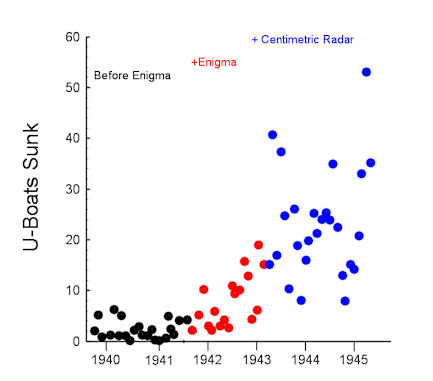
U-boat losses

Historians disagree about the relative importance of the anti-U-boat measures. Max Hastings states that "In 1941 alone, Ultra [breaking the German code] saved between 1.5 and two million tons of Allied ships from destruction." This would be a 40 per cent to 53 per cent reduction. A history based on the German archives written for the British Admiralty after the war by a former U-boat commander and son-in-law of Dönitz reports that several detailed investigations to discover whether their operations were compromised by broken code were negative and that their defeat ".. was due firstly to outstanding developments in enemy radar ..." The graphs of the data are colour coded to divide the battle into three epochs— before the breaking of the Enigma code, after it was broken, and after the introduction of centimetric radar, which could reveal submarine conning towers above the surface of the water and even detect periscopes. Obviously this subdivision of the data ignores many other defensive measures the Allies developed during the war, so interpretation must be constrained. Codebreaking by itself did not decrease the losses, which continued to rise ominously. More U-boats were sunk, but the number operational had more than tripled. After the improved radar came into action shipping losses plummeted, reaching a level significantly (p=0.99) below the early months of the war. The development of the improved radar by the Allies began in 1940, before the United States entered the war, when Henry Tizard and A. V. Hill won permission to share British secret research with the Americans, including bringing them a cavity magnetron, which generates the needed high-frequency radio waves. All sides will agree with Hastings that "... mobilization of the best civilian brains, and their integration into the war effort at the highest levels, was an outstanding British success story."

== In popular culture ==
=== Films ===
- U-Boote westwärts!, 1941 propaganda film
- Action in the North Atlantic, 1943 American war film about sailors of the US Merchant Marine battling a U-boat.
- Corvette K-225, 1943 American film about Royal Canadian Navy convoy escort
- San Demetrio London, 1943 film based on the true story a tanker salvaged by some of her crew after being attacked by the German cruiser Admiral Scheer
- Western Approaches, 1944 British colour film dramatising the experience of merchant sailors in a lifeboat
- The Cruel Sea, 1953 film about a Royal Navy escort crew during the Battle
- The Enemy Below, 1956 film about an American destroyer captain who matches wits with a U-boat captain
- Sink the Bismarck!, 1960 film about the hunt for the German battleship
- Das Boot, 1981 German film about a German U-boat and its crew
- U-571, 2000 film about a U-boat boarded by disguised United States Navy submariners
- In Enemy Hands, 2004 film about American sailors taken captive on a U-boat
- Greyhound, 2020 film about an American Commander defending a convoy from U-boats
- Comandante, 2023 film about the sinking of the Belgian ship Kabalo by the Italian submarine Comandante Cappellini.
- The Ministry of Ungentlemanly Warfare, 2024 action comedy war film, that portrays a fictionalised version of the Operation Postmaster and the role played by Winston Churchill's S.O.E.

=== Tabletop games ===
- Submarine, 1976 Avalon Hill strategy game.
- U-Boat, 1976 Heritage Models miniatures strategy game.
- U-Boat, 1959 Avalon Hill strategy game.
- Wolfpack, 1974 Simulations Publications, Inc. solitaire strategy game.
- War at Sea, 1975 Avalon Hill strategy game.

=== Computer games ===
- Aces of the Deep, 1994 U-boat simulator video game
- Silent Hunter II, second of a series
- Destroyer Command, 2002 naval simulation video game
- Silent Hunter III, 2005 U-boat simulator video game, third of a series
- Silent Hunter 5, 2010 U-boat simulator video game, fifth of a series
- UBOAT, 2024 U-boat simulator video game

== See also ==
- British merchant seamen of World War II
- British Security Co-ordination
- Convoy battles of World War II
- Irish Mercantile Marine during World War II
- List of German U-boats in World War II
- List of wolfpacks of World War II
- Monsun Gruppe, the German U-boat campaign in the Indian Ocean
