= Secular movement =

Social and political trend in the United States

The secular movement refers to a social and political trend in the United States, beginning in the early years of the 20th century, with the founding of the American Association for the Advancement of Atheism in 1925 and the American Humanist Association in 1941, in which atheists, agnostics, secular humanists, freethinkers, and other nonreligious and nontheistic Americans have grown in both numbers and visibility. There has been a sharp increase in the number of Americans who identify as religiously unaffiliated, from under 10 percent in the 1990s to 20 percent in 2013. The trend is especially pronounced among young people, with about one in three Americans younger than 30 identifying as religiously unaffiliated, a figure that has nearly tripled since the 1990s.

The secular movement in the United States believes a secular government is essential to religious freedom. It is generally opposed to religious overreach, including the Christian right, and promotes liberal positions on social issues such as gay rights, reproductive rights, and separation of church and state.

== Organizations ==
The secular movement has involved the rapid growth of national and local atheist, agnostic, freethinker, and humanist groups, with organizations such as American Atheists, the American Humanist Association, the Freedom From Religion Foundation, and the Atheist Republic reporting rising membership and like-minded groups appearing in communities around the country. This trend has been aided in part by the Internet, which has allowed atheists and other secularists to connect through blogs and social media websites such as Facebook, Twitter, and Meetup. This has enabled the formation of secular groups even in conservative, Bible Belt areas. National secular groups that once had constituencies of a few thousand have used social media to attract followings in the hundreds of thousands. Secular student groups in colleges and high schools have also seen rapid growth. The Secular Student Alliance, a national group formed in 2001, grew from 80 campus affiliates in 2007 to almost 400 in 2013.

In 2014, reflecting an approach similar to the "coming out" strategy of the gay rights movement, a group called Openly Secular was formed to encourage nonreligious and nontheistic Americans to speak out. The group's mission "is to eliminate discrimination and increase acceptance by getting secular people—including atheists, freethinkers, agnostics, humanists, and nonreligious people—to be open about their beliefs." In one video produced for the group, comedian and television personality Bill Maher urged atheists to be open about their religious skepticism, dismissing the Bible as a book "based on ancient myths".

== Advertising ==
The secular movement works to increase the visibility of nonbelievers, including through advertising campaigns. With the number of local secular groups growing, a national group, the United Coalition of Reason, was formed in 2009 to use advertising as a means of promoting those groups. It operates by entering a media market and working with local atheist and humanist groups to form a local "Coalition of Reason", and then purchasing local advertising, usually billboards or transit ads, to promote that coalition. The group has executed this strategy in over 75 media markets in the United States. Typical ads convey messages such as "Are You Good Without God? Millions Are" and "Don't believe in God? You are not alone." These ads often create local controversies, and have sometimes been vandalized.

== Political involvement ==
In 2002, the Secular Coalition for America was formed to lobby on behalf of secular Americans in Washington, D.C. In 2007, as a result of a campaign by the group, Rep. Pete Stark of California became the first open atheist in the United States Congress. In 2013, a political action committee was launched to support nonreligious political candidates and candidates sympathetic to atheist and humanist concerns. The Secular Coalition for America claims that over two dozen members of Congress have privately reported being atheists, but refrain from openly identifying as such.

== Lawsuits ==
As America's secular demographic has grown and become more visible and active, a number of lawsuits have been brought to challenge references to God and religion in government. These cases have had limited success.

In 2002, the Ninth Circuit Court of Appeals ruled that the inclusion of the words "under God" in the Pledge of Allegiance violated the Establishment Clause of the United States Constitution. That ruling was overturned by the United States Supreme Court in Elk Grove Unified School District v. Newdow, 542 U.S. 1 (2004). The Supreme Court ruled against the plaintiff, Michael Newdow, not on the substantive legal issue but on a technicality, declaring that he lacked legal standing because he did not have custody of his daughter, on whose behalf he had brought the suit. Newdow subsequently filed a second case, and in 2010, the Ninth Circuit reversed its earlier decision and ruled that the "under God" wording did not violate the Establishment Clause.

In 2007, the Supreme Court ruled against the Freedom From Religion Foundation in Hein v. Freedom From Religion Foundation, 551 U.S. 587 (2007), which challenged the expenditure of tax money through the White House Office of Faith-Based and Community Initiatives. The court ruled that taxpayers do not have legal standing to challenge expenditures by the executive branch. In 2011, the Seventh Circuit Court of Appeals rejected a challenge to the National Day of Prayer, again on standing grounds. In 2013, a federal court rejected a challenge, brought by Newdow and the Freedom From Religion Foundation, to remove "In God We Trust" from American currency.

In 2014, courts in Massachusetts and New Jersey rejected challenges to state laws requiring daily recitation of the Pledge of Allegiance in public schools. The lawsuits, brought by the American Humanist Association, claimed that equal protection guarantees under the respective state constitutions prohibited daily recitation of the pledge because the "under God" wording discriminated against atheists. The courts ruled that, because participation in the exercise is voluntary, the laws do not violate equal protection.

In Town of Greece v. Galloway, the Supreme Court in 2014 rejected a challenge to the use of sectarian prayers by some local legislative bodies. Though seen as a setback for church-state separation, the ruling also stated that municipalities cannot discriminate against minority faiths in allowing invocations, and atheists and humanists subsequently used it to assert their right to participate in the invocation process. Months after the Galloway ruling, an atheist gave the invocation at a regular meeting of the Town of Greece board.

The secular movement has also been active in public discourse over the definition of religious freedom. Atheist and humanist groups opposed the Supreme Court's 2014 decision in Burwell v. Hobby Lobby Stores, Inc., which gave corporate employers the right to opt out of the birth control mandate of the Affordable Care Act on religious freedom grounds.

== Reason Rally ==
In March 2012, several national secular groups sponsored a Reason Rally on the National Mall in Washington, D.C., with a lineup of speakers and performers that included Richard Dawkins, Tim Minchin, Bad Religion, and James Randi. The stated purpose of the rally was "to unify, energize, and embolden secular people nationwide". Crowd estimates ranged from 8000 to 30,000. In 2015, organizers announced plans for a second Reason Rally, but did not set a date. The second quadrennial Reason Rally was held on June 4, 2016 at the Lincoln Memorial in Washington, D.C.

== Connection to New Atheism ==
New Atheist authors such as Dawkins, Sam Harris, Daniel Dennett, and Christopher Hitchens helped give the secular movement momentum, though many American secularists disagree with the politics and style of the New Atheists. Dawkins has been involved in public disputes with atheist feminists who have criticized remarks he has made about sexual harassment. The New Atheist authors have been highly critical of Islam, connecting terrorism to the religion of the perpetrators, and many secularists have denounced such views as Islamophobic. Some within the secular movement, such as the American Humanist Association, have expressed "a strong distaste for efforts to propagate a crusade mentality against Islam". However other prominent figures in the Secular movement disagree, such as Ayaan Hirsi Ali, who believes that "political correctness is counterproductive" and that we must "acknowledge the issue of Islam."

== Activists & Prominent Figures ==
- Madalyn Murray O'Hair, activist who founded American Atheists in 1963 and sued to get a Supreme Court decision to ban Bible reading in U.S. schools.
- Michael Newdow, activist who unsuccessfully sued to get "Under God" out of the Pledge of Allegiance
- Lawrence M. Krauss, Physicist who wrote the book A Universe from Nothing to explain a scientific origin of the Universe without a God figure, and made a documentary on secular atheism called "The Unbelievers"
- Richard Dawkins, author of "The God Delusion" and several other books that focus on a secular world view, as well as an activist who founded Richard Dawkins Foundation for Reason and Science in 2006 whose motto is: "to promote scientific literacy and secularism."
- Christopher Hitchens, author of God Is Not Great and was on the advisory board of the Secular Coalition for America
- Daniel Dennett, author of Breaking the Spell: Religion as a Natural Phenomenon and secular activist on the advisory board of Secular Coalition for America and Committee for Skeptical Inquiry.
- Sam Harris, author of The End of Faith and has supported spreading secularism specifically in the Muslim world by co-writing the book Islam and the Future of Tolerance with a secular Muslim.
- Ayaan Hirsi Ali, author and activist. Wrote Infidel: My Life and Heretic: Why Islam Needs a Reformation Now where she lays out five-point reformation for Islam. She founded AHA Foundation in 2007.
- James Randi, former magician turned secularist who has dedicated his life to exposing psychics and mystics, author of Flim-Flam!
- Stephen Fry, comedian, actor, and activist. Works for Humanists UK.
