= İnci =

İnci or Inci is a feminine given name and surname of Turkish origin. It means "pearl" in Turkish. Notable people with the name include:

== Given name ==
- İnci Aral (born 1944), Turkish writer
- İnci Asena (born 1948), Turkish publisher, poet, and model
- İnci Birol (1933–2022), Turkish belly dancer and actress
- İnci Güçlü (born 1999), Turkish basketball player
- İnci Ece Öztürk (born 1997), Turkish bocce volo player
- İnci Türkay (born 1972), Turkish actress and acting teacher
- Inci Y. (born 1970), Turkish German pseudonymous author

== Surname ==
- Arman İnci (born 1991), Turkish-German actor
- Erdal İnci (born 1983), Turkish new media artist
- Nazlıcan İnci (born 2000), Turkish badminton player

== See also ==
- İnci Sözlük, Turkish dictionary-style internet forum
- Inci
