= The Caged Virgin =

2004 book by Ayaan Hirsi Ali

- Cover of the original Dutch edition
- Author: Ayaan Hirsi Ali
- Original title: De maagdenkooi
- Language: Dutch
- Subject: Women in Islam
- Publisher: Free Press
- Publication date: August 2004
- English publication date: April 2006
- Media type: Print
- Pages: 187
- ISBN: 978-0-7432-8833-0
- OCLC: 64390639
- Dewey Decimal: 297.082
- LC Class: BP173.4 .H5813 2006
- Preceded by: De zoontjesfabriek
- Followed by: Infidel

The Caged Virgin: A Muslim Woman's Cry for Reason, also published as The Caged Virgin: An Emancipation Proclamation for Women and Islam (Dutch: De maagdenkooi), is a 2004 book by the former Dutch parliamentarian Ayaan Hirsi Ali. The Caged Virgin was first published in English in 2006.

== Publication history ==
The book was first published in Dutch as De maagdenkooi ("The Virgin's Cage" or "The Cage of Virgins") in August 2004 as a collection of seven essays and one interview with Irshad Manji, totalling 79 pages. Like its predecessor De zoontjesfabriek (December 2002), a Dutch-language collection of seven essays and one interview for a total of 95 pages, it focused on criticism of the position and role of women in Islam. Around September 2004, Finnish publishing house Otava was one of the first to approach Hirsi Ali with plans to translate her writings.

Hirsi Ali had been under the constant protection of an armed security detail ever since September 2002 after receiving death threats for months for her earliest writings (that would later be bundled in De zoontjesfabriek), television appearances and renouncing Islam. Shortly after she published De maagdenkooi, the 11-minute shortfilm Submission, that she produced together with film director Theo van Gogh, was first screened on Dutch television on 29 August 2004. It presented four fictional episodes involving violence against women and Quranic verses that could be used to justify it. After Muslim extremist Mohammed Bouyeri shot and stabbed Van Gogh to death in Amsterdam on 4 November 2004, leaving a five-page note with a death threat to Hirsi Ali as well, she had to go in hiding for two months. Meanwhile, the shock of the attack raised international interest in her writings. In March 2005, Hirsi Ali faced a lawsuit over a claim made by four Dutch Muslim men that the De maagdenkooi contained "blasphemous and offensive" statements, but the suit was rejected.

A compilation of De zoontjesfabriek and De maagdenkooi was translated to German and published in May 2005 under the title Ich klage an. Plädoyer für die Befreiung der muslimischen Frauen ("I accuse. Plea for the Liberation of Muslim Women"), which became a bestseller in Germany, defeating new pope Joseph Ratzinger's biography. In Italy, a similar compilation and the scenario of Submission were released by Einaudi on 10 April 2005 under the name Non sottomessa. Contro la segregazione nella società islamica ("Not Submissive. Against Segregation in Islamic Society"), which also became a bestseller. By June 2015, it was also translated into French (Insoumise, also became a bestseller in France), Turkish and Finnish. The Finnish edition, titled Neitsythäkki, omitted Hirsi Ali's most controversial quote from a January 2003 Trouw interview, namely that "Muhammad was a perverse tyrant". Publisher Otava claimed this was a "technical error", an explanation that made Hirsi Ali laugh; she said Otava should apologise, correct it and not engage in censorship. The August 2005 Swedish translation was titled Kräv er rätt! Om kvinnor, islam och en bättre värld ("Demand your rights! On Women, Islam and a Better World"); Hirsi Ali visited Stockholm to promote it, and received the Liberal People's Party's Democracy Prize there. By May 2006, the book had been translated into about 10 languages.

In April 2006, an English translation was published by Free Press under the title The Caged Virgin, which was a compilation of three essays from De zoontjesfabriek, five essays plus the Manji interview from De maagdenkooi, the script of Submission, as well as several new essays, jointly encompassing 187 pages. The 2008 American edition omitted two of the 2006 version's essays and added two more for 188 pages.

== Contents ==
De maagdenkooi (original Dutch edition, August 2004)

1. De maagdenkooi
2. Vier casestory's uit de Somalisch-islamitische praktijk
3. Hoezo uiting van trots?
4. Pak huiselijk geweld effectiever aan
5. Genitale verminking mag niet worden gedoogd
6. De nachtmerrie van Bin Laden – Interview met Irshad Manji
7. Op zoek naar wat ons bindt
8. 10 tips voor moslima's die weg willen

Note: the equivalent chapters that feature in both editions,
have been marked by colours.

The Caged Virgin (first English edition, April 2006)
- Preface: Breaking Through the Islamic Curtain

1. Stand Up for Your Rights! Women in Islam (adapted from De zoontjesfabriek)
2. Why Can't We Take a Critical Look at Ourselves? (adapted from De zoontjesfabriek)
3. The Virgins' Cage
4. Let Us Have a Voltaire (adapted from De zoontjesfabriek)
5. What Went Wrong? A Modern Clash of Cultures
6. A Brief Personal History of My Emancipation
7. Being a Politician Is Not My Ideal
8. Bin Laden's Nightmare – Interview with Irshad Manji
9. Freedom Requires Constant Vigilance
10. Four Women's Lives
11. How to Deal with Domestic Violence More Effectively
12. Genital Mutilation Must Not Be Tolerated
13. Ten Tips for Muslim Women Who Want to Leave
14. Submission: Part I
15. The Need For Self-Reflection Within Islam
16. Portrait of a Heroine as a Young Woman
17. A Call for Clear Thinking

According to Christopher Hitchens, the English edition has three themes: "first, her own gradual emancipation from tribalism and superstition; second, her work as a parliamentarian to call attention to the crimes being committed every day by Islamist thugs in mainland Europe; and third, the dismal silence, or worse, from many feminists and multiculturalists about this state of affairs."

In the book Hirsi Ali discusses her own struggle with Islam, intended as a model how other Muslim women may achieve their own emancipation. In advising women how to address the divide between Western and Islamic thought, she draws on her firsthand knowledge of the Islamic world and the philosophical tradition originating in the Enlightenment.

Hirsi Ali contends that in Islamic regions Muslim women who seek solace and escape from Islam are typically threatened with death, and those Muslim women who do escape the "virgins' cage" are branded whores. The author discusses Islamic views on the role of women, the rights of individuals, the roots of Islamic fanaticism, and proposes Western policies toward Muslim-majority countries and immigrant communities. Hirsi Ali emphasises how Muslim women have no basic rights in their lives. She describes how Muslim women are trapped not just in one, but two cages; a physical one where their movements are monitored, and a metaphysical one, which restricts their religious and cultural beliefs. In the chapter "Ten Tips for Muslim Women Who Want to Leave", she describes the steps Muslim girls and young women can take in order to escape their conservative Islamic parental homes and live a life of their own choice.

== Reception ==
=== Dutch edition ===
Reviewing De maagdenkooi for de Volkskrant, Anet Bleich opined that the Ten Tips for Muslim girls who want to escape the metaphorical virgin's cage at the book's end were "well-reasoned and wise advice; this open letter is Hirsi Ali at her finest". However, Bleich dubbed her an "uncompromising idealist: that is both her strength and weakness. It's great that she constantly succeeds in making her point about the oppression of Muslim women. But it's a shame that she doesn't have the patience to look for allies in her own Enlightened Muslim circle."

In early September 2004, Trouw called it a "hard-hitting" book, especially the stories from the four Somali women that Hirsi Ali acquainted during her job as an interpreter. De maagdenkooi was readily compatible with the film Submission that premiered on the Zomergasten programme soon after. A December 2004 Trouw review by Paul-Kleis Jager wondered whether it was necessary to criticise the religion itself in order to liberate Muslim girls and women, pointing to the recently emerged French feminist movement Ni Putes Ni Soumises that was led by secular Muslim woman Fadela Amara. Yet, he found it difficult to deny how intimately the virginity cult in Islam was tied to the core teachings of the Quran and the Traditions of Muhammad, causing few Muslim girls and women to have a choice in determining "whether, and if so, whom they married to; and whether, and if so, how many children they wanted to get". Such attitudes, Jager agreed with Hirsi Ali, resulted in "illiterate unhealthy mothers sitting at home, unable to guide their children into the world of education and labour," which was "complicit in the economic lag of Muslims".

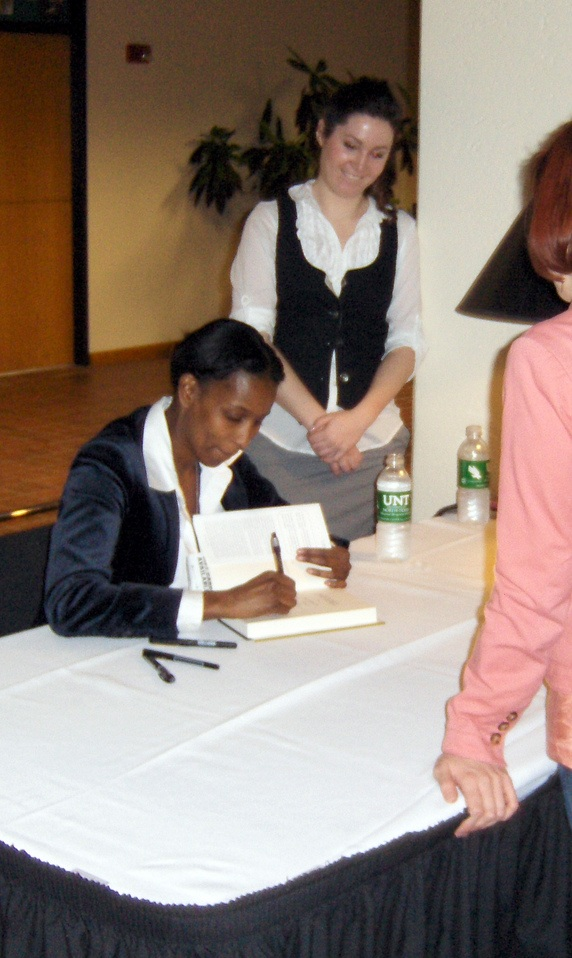
Ayaan Hirsi Ali signing books, 2008

NRC Handelsblad critic Beatrijs Ritsema labelled it a "somewhat disorderly booklet, a kind of anti-Islam almanac", but praised its style: "What an enthusiasm, and so often Hirsi Ali is spot on." Ritsema agreed with Hirsi Ali that domestic violence prevention agencies should work better together, and the abuser rather than the victim should be moved out of the house. She did not agree, however, that all Muslim men sexually oppress Muslim women, though admitted many of them did. Ritsema was more optimistic about the degree to which third-generation Muslim immigrants integrated in Western society and adapted to progressive cultural norms regarding sexual autonomy and gender equality. She emphasised there were major differences amongst Muslims just as there were amongst the native Dutch, though the former still had a lot of catching up to do.

=== German edition ===
Der Spiegel noted that Hirsi Ali's book, of which the German edition Ich klage an had already sold 80,000 copies between May and August 2005, fitted in a new emerging genre of books about Muslim women who escaped forced marriage arranged by their families and managed to establish a free life in Europe. Ayaan's work was compared to Ich wollte nur frei sein ("I Just Wanted to be Free") by Hülya Kalkan, Mich hat keiner gefragt ("Nobody Asked Me") by Ayşe, Erstickt an euren Lügen ("Choke on your Lies") by Inci Y., Fundamentalismus gegen Frauen ("Fundamentalism Against Women") by Nawal El Saadawi and Verschleppt in Jemen ("Kidnapped in Yemen") by Zana Muhsen.

=== English edition ===
Natasha Walter of The Guardian wrote that "The Caged Virgin is a shocking read. Ayaan Hirsi Ali rages at crimes that are done to women by men: from forced marriage to female genital mutilation; from denial of education to sexual abuse within the family. Her fury about these crimes makes her essays vibrant and inspiring." However, "Hirsi Ali not only paints the whole of the Islamic world with one black brush, she also paints the whole of the western world with rosy tints in order to set it as perfect day to the bleak night of the Muslim world."

The book was also lauded by the author and journalist Christopher Hitchens in Slate: "I would urge you all to go out and buy her new book, The Caged Virgin, which is subtitled An Emancipation Proclamation for Women and Islam. (...) Considering that this book is written by a woman who was circumcised against her will at a young age and then very nearly handed over as a bargain with a stranger, it is written with quite astonishing humor and restraint." Voicing his frustration and anger over the "shameful" way Hirsi Ali had been treated in the Netherlands, Hitchens expressed the hope "that it will shame us all into making The Caged Virgin a best seller."

Uma Narayan said the book was fragmented with bits of autobiography and a motivational letter. Hirsi Ali’s outrage at the discrimination of Muslim women was one dimensional, and struggled to bind feminism, racism and internationalism in the same book. For Narayan, Islam, like any other culture is permeable, it is dynamic and the boundaries constantly shift. She criticized Ali for having a generalized portrayal of the Muslim society, and assigning all Muslim cultures as violent and discriminatory. She missed the aspects of cross-cultural similarities, as well as possible internal cultural divisions.

According to other authors, Islam, like every religious belief, has been hard wired into the society and it is very difficult to change these beliefs over a short span of time. However, Ali states that these cultural beliefs and ideas are not subject to any change or reform. Other reviewers like Leti Volp criticized Ali for highlighting culture only in some cases throughout the book but not all, which was considered as a political attempt to gain popularity, given her political interest and position at that time.

Saba Mahmood wrote that the title of the work is "highly reminiscent of the nineteenth-century literary genre centered on Orientalist fantasies of the harem" and the book itself "full of absurd statements" such as "[Muslim] children learn from their mothers that it pays to lie. Mistrust is everywhere and lies rule".

== See also ==
- Criticism of Islam
- Women in Islam
