= Birol =

Birol is a masculine given name of Turkish origin. Notable people with the name include:

== Given name ==
- Birol Aksancak (born 1979), Turkish footballer
- Birol Emir (born 1966), Turkish-American statistician
- Birol Hikmet (born 1982), Turkish footballer
- Birol Parlak (born 1990), Turkish footballer
- Birol Pekel (1938–2004), Turkish footballer
- Birol Topaloğlu (born 1965), Turkish folk musician and activist
- Birol Ünel (1961–2020), Turkish-German actor

== See also ==
- Birol (surname)
