= Taida =

Taida may be:

- Tianjin Taida, Chinese football club based in Tianjin
- Taida Pasić, Yugoslav-born refugee in the Netherlands
- A colloquial name for National Taiwan University, Taipei, Taiwan
- Taida, or Taite, An ancient Assyrian city
