= Hersi =

Hersi may refer to:

- Youssouf Hersi, Dutch footballer
- Mohamud Muse Hersi, Somali politician
- Amina Moghe Hersi, Somali entrepreneur
- Hersi Aman legendary 3rd Sultan of the Habr Yunis
- Khalil Abdulkadir Farah Hersi (1946–2005), Somali poet
- Hersi Matmuja, Albanian singer
- Hussein Hersi, entrepreneur in Columbus, Ohio
- Hersi Ali Magan, Somali scholar and the father of Ayaan Hersi Ali
- Ayaan Hersi Ali, Somali-born Dutch-American activist, feminist, author, scholar and politician, daughter of Hersi Ali Magan
