= Pasić =

Pasić may refer to:

- Pasić, Bosnia and Herzegovina, a village near Tomislavgrad
- Taida Pasić (born 1987), Kosovan refugee
