= IAF =

IAF may refer to:

== Air forces ==
- Indian Air Force
- Indonesian Air Force
- Iraqi Air Force
- Islamic Republic of Iran Air Force
- Israeli Air Force
- Italian Air Force

== Other organizations ==
- Independent Arts Foundation, an arts association in Adelaide, Australia
- Indian Armed Forces, the military forces of the Republic of India
- Industrial Areas Foundation, a national community organizing network
- Inter-American Foundation, an independent agency of the United States government
- International Abolitionist Federation, founded in Liverpool in 1875
- International Accreditation Forum, a former world association of Conformity Assessment Accreditation bodies
- International Aikido Federation, a world governing body for the sport of Aikido
- International of Anarchist Federations, founded during an international anarchist conference in Carrara in 1968
- International Apostolic Fellowship, a fellowship of Apostolic ministers
- International Astronautical Federation, an international space advocacy organisation
- Iowa Atheists and Freethinkers, a U.S. non-profit organization
- Islamic Action Front, an Islamist political party in Jordan
- Israel Allies Foundation, a pro-Israel advocacy group
- Iraqi Accord Front, a Sunni Arab-led Iraqi political coalition

== Other uses ==
- Initial approach fix, where the initial approach segment of an instrument approach begins
- Intangible asset finance, the branch of finance that deals with intangible assets
- Integrated Architecture Framework, a recognized architecture method in the Open Group's IT Architecture Certification (ITAC) program
- Integrate-and-fire, a model for describing neurons
- Fraunhofer Institute for Applied Solid State Physics, a German institute operated by the Fraunhofer Society
- Jane's IAF: Israeli Air Force, 1998 video game
