= Ghersi =

Ghersi is a surname. Notable people with the surname include:

- Alejandra Ghersi (born 1989), Venezuelan record producer, DJ, singer, and songwriter
- Enrique Ghersi (born 1961), Peruvian lawyer and professor
- Pietro Ghersi (1899–1972), Italian motorcycle racer

== See also ==
- Hersi
