= Pašić =

Pašić (Serbian Cyrillic: Пашић) is a South Slavic surname derived from Paša. Notable people with the surname include:

- Feliks Pašić (1939–2010), Serbian theatre and literary critic, publicist, journalist and translator
- Ilijas Pašić (1934–2015), retired Yugoslav football player and coach
- Tatjana Pašić (born 1964), Serbian politician
- Nikola Pašić (1845–1926), Serbian politician and diplomat
- Nikola Pasic (ice hockey) (born 2000), Serbian ice hockey player
- Predrag Pašić (born 1958), retired Bosnian football player
- Teofil Pašić (c. 1700–1759), Ruthenian and Croatian Greek Catholic hierarch

== See also ==
- Pasić (disambiguation)
- PASIC, the Percussive Arts Society International Convention
