= De zoontjesfabriek =

Book by Ayaan Hirsi Ali

- Author: Ayaan Hirsi Ali
- Language: Dutch
- Subject: Women in Islam, criticism of Islam
- Genre: Collection of essays
- Publisher: Uitgeverij Augustus
- Publication date: December 2002
- English publication date: –
- Media type: Print
- Pages: 94
- ISBN: 9789045703558
- Preceded by: –
- Followed by: The Caged Virgin

De zoontjesfabriek. Over vrouwen, islam en integratie (English: The Son Factory: On Women, Islam and Integration) is the title of Ayaan Hirsi Ali's first book, which was published in Dutch in December 2002. It is a collection of all articles (seven in total) that Hirsi Ali had published up till then, and an interview with Dutch feminist author Colet van der Ven.

The book was frequently discussed, translated and became a bestseller in Germany (published together with The Caged Virgin in 2005 under the title Ich klage an. Plädoyer für die Befreiung der muslimischen Frauen) and Italy (also published in 2005 together with The Caged Virgin and the scenario of Submission under the name Non sottomessa. Contro la segregazione nella società islamica).

== Contents ==
The book contains the following articles:

- 'Ik wil dat het hier en nu gebeurt'. ('I want it to happen here and now') – Interview by Colet van der Ven
- Tussen confrontatie en verzoening. Nederland en de islam ('Between confrontation and reconciliation'. The Netherlands and Islam)
- Laat ons niet in de steek. Gun ons een Voltaire ('Don't abandon us. Grant us a Voltaire')
- Waarom lukt het ons niet om naar onszelf te kijken? ('Why do we fail to look at ourselves?')
- Moslima's, eis je rechten op! ('Muslimas, demand your rights!')
- PvdA onderschat het lijden van moslimvrouwen ('Labour Party underestimates Muslim women's suffering')
- Schurende normen. Over integratie als inwijding in de moderniteit ('Scouring standards. On integration as inauguration into modernity')
- Waarom ik de VVD verkies boven de PvdA ('Why I prefer the Liberal Party over the Labour Party')

Publisher Uitgeverij Augustus gave the following summary in the form of a quote from Hirsi Ali from the book: "A Muslim woman achieves a higher status the more sons she has. When my grandmother was asked how many children she had, she said: 'One.' She had nine daughters and one son. She said the same about our family. That we only had one child. 'What about us?' my sister and I asked. 'You are going to get us little sons,' she answered. It made me desperate. What was I supposed to do with my life on earth? Giving birth to little sons! Becoming a son factory. I was nine years old back then.

To fulfil their future function as son factories to the best of their abilities, girls are taught from early on to obey. To obey God, father, brother, family, clan. The better a woman succeeds in that, the more virtuous she is considered. You always need to be patient, even when your husband desires the most terrible things of you. And you will be rewarded for that in the afterlife. But that reward amounts to little. For women in paradise, there are dates and grapes. Nothing more."

== Reception ==
According to ex-communist Jolande Withuis, who discussed De zoontjesfabriek in NRC Handelsblad, Hirsi Ali formulated 'a time-honoured feminist point', namely that the specific interests and rights of women are unjustly forgotten or ignored when socialists frame them as part of an oppressed collective (in 1933, the working class; in 2002, the allochtonen). In socialist thought, such an oppressed collective must show unity in the face of "the oppressors" and segments of this oppressed collective such as men cannot be criticised. For Withuis, "[s]uch criticism would weaken the position of the oppressed social class, you'd play into the hands of the 'right', and you'd accuse 'victims' of misdeeds (which is impossible in this mindset). 'Groupthink' denies the conflicting interests amongst the oppressed, which serves in favour of the most powerful inside such a group." Withuis found that Hirsi Ali was right in accusing the Labour Party of forgetting Muslim women, but wondered whether her choice for the Liberal Party was all that much better, especially if it would form a governing coalition with the Christian Democratic Appeal, which Withuis alleged to be even less friendly to (Muslim) women.

For de Volkskrant, Wim Wirtz reviewed Hirsi Ali's book during the ongoing controversy about her statements and her defection from Labour to the Liberals. 'Whoever takes the time to uninhibitedly study the booklet De zoontjesfabriek (...) will have to try pretty hard to find any offensive texts in it,' he remarked, though adding that this might be because, as a Westerner, he 'is used to the possibility of having his whole kith and kine being subjected to discussion in a democratic Rechtsstaat without repercussions.' According to Wirtz, the book was nuanced and did not reject all of Islam, but held a fiery plea for reforming Islam, especially with respect to Muslim women: 'no more physical abuse, forced genital cutting, arranged marriage, legitimised rape and a second-class position as a 'son factory' within the Muslim community.'

In the Flemish newspaper De Morgen, a reviewer of Moroccan origin wrote that Hirsi Ali's observations, especially the notion that 'a Muslim woman gains in status the more sons she has', made her think a lot about 'my own family, my own environment, also stories that I've heard from other Muslim girls'. In her judgement, 'Hirsi Ali sometimes misses subtlety when she writes about Islam, and that is because she often proceeds from generalisations. Other times, however, she hits the nails right on the head.'

Trouw journalist and theologian Lodewijk Dros coined the term Verlichtingsfundamentalisme ("Enlightenment fundamentalism") on 29 January 2003 when reflecting on De zoontjesfabriek and Hirsi Ali's recent statement that Muhammad was 'a perverse tyrant'. For his part, her calls for reforming and moderating Islam ('Enlightening') were worthy of praise, but Dros claimed she actually wanted to go even further and fight against religion as a whole, citing passages such as 'I've got nothing against religion as a source of consolation, but I do reject religion as a standard for morality, as a guide for life.' Dros therefore put Hirsi Ali in a line of other radical atheists ('Enlightenment fundamentalists') such as Herman Philipse, Paul Cliteur, Maarten 't Hart and Rudy Kousbroek.
