= Inci =

Inci or INCI may refer to:

- Tumpong, Philippine bamboo flute
- İnci, Turkish name
- INCI, the International Nomenclature of Cosmetic Ingredients
- İnci Sözlük, Turkish dictionary-style internet forum
