= Birol (surname) =

Birol is a surname of Turkish origin. Notable people with the name include:

== Surname ==
- Fatih Birol (born 1958), Turkish economist
- Inci Birol (1933–2022), Turkish belly dancer and actress
- Şenol Birol (1936–2022), Turkish footballer
- Ümit Birol (1963–2023), Turkish football player and manager
