= Zembla (TV series) =

Dutch documentary television series

Zembla is a Dutch television documentary programme produced by BNNVARA (previously VARA, and until 2010, also NPS). The documentaries are based on in-depth research. The program often deals with controversial topics.

A documentary in 2001 about fraud in the Dutch construction sector led to parliamentary inquiries.

In May 2006, the programme exposed the fact that politician Ayaan Hirsi Ali had lied in her claim for asylum, which led to her resignation from parliament.

In May 2017, Zembla aired a two-part documentary investigating ties between Donald Trump and the Russian mafia, entitled The Dubious Friends of Donald Trump (De omstreden vrienden van Trump). An English-language version of the documentary with additional reference materials in English was also put online. There is now a third part to the series.

In May 2019 Zembla published a report, Victim of the WWF, criticising policies condoned by the World Wildlife Fund and their infringements of the human rights of the native population of the Kaziranga National Park in India.
