= Infidel: My Life =

2006 book by Ayaan Hirsi Ali

- Author: Ayaan Hirsi Ali
- Original title: Mijn Vrijheid
- Genre: Autobiography
- Publisher: Free Press
- Publication date: 2006
- English publication date: 2007
- Pages: 368
- ISBN: 0-7432-9503-X
- Preceded by: The Caged Virgin
- Followed by: Nomad: From Islam to America

Infidel: My Life is a 2006 autobiography of Ayaan Hirsi Ali, a Somali-Dutch activist and politician. Hirsi Ali has attracted controversy and death threats were made against Ali in the early 2000s over the publication of the book.

== Synopsis ==
Hirsi Ali writes about her youth in Somalia, Saudi Arabia, Ethiopia and Kenya; about her flight to the Netherlands where she applied for political asylum, her university experience in Leiden, her work for the Labour Party, her transfer to the People's Party for Freedom and Democracy, her election to Parliament, and the murder of Theo van Gogh, with whom she made the film Submission. The book ends with a discussion of the controversy regarding her application for asylum and status of her citizenship.

== Reception ==
The launch of the book in the Netherlands was considered a success, with the initial print run selling out in two days. A review in de Volkskrant concluded that "anyone who discovers Hirsi Ali's tumultuous history can only sympathise with her". The German edition of the book, Mein Leben, meine Freiheit ("My Life, My Freedom"), debuted in the top 20 of the bestseller list of Der Spiegel.

The book was also well received upon the release of the English edition in 2007. Reviewing the book for The Sunday Times, Christopher Hitchens called it a "remarkable book." Hitchens provided a foreword to the 2008 paperback edition.

The Pulitzer Prize-winning author Anne Applebaum, writing in The Washington Post, said "Infidel is a unique book, Ayaan Hirsi Ali is a unique writer, and both deserve to go far." A review in The New York Times described the book as a "brave, inspiring and beautifully written memoir". In an interview, Newsweek editor Fareed Zakaria described it as "an amazing book by an amazing person".
