= Nomad: From Islam to America =

2010 book by Ayaan Hirsi Ali

- Cover of the first edition
- Author: Ayaan Hirsi Ali
- Language: English
- Genre: Autobiography
- Publisher: Free Press
- Publication date: 2010
- Media type: Print
- ISBN: 978-1-4391-5731-2
- Preceded by: Infidel: My Life
- Followed by: Heretic: Why Islam Needs a Reformation Now

Nomad: From Islam to America: A Personal Journey Through the Clash of Civilizations (first published May 18, 2010) is a memoir by Somali-born Dutch-American writer, politician and activist Ayaan Hirsi Ali. It is a sequel to her New York Times bestseller Infidel. It deals in greater depth than the earlier book with certain aspects of the author's childhood in Somalia, Kenya and Saudi Arabia, and in particular with her family, as well as with her exile from the Netherlands and her present home with the American Enterprise Institute in the United States. The book is critical of Islam and the multiculturalism which the author sees as enabling Muslim extremism. It sets out to make the case that moderate Christian churches should seek actively to convert Muslim believers. The book has been praised by Christopher Hitchens, John Lloyd, and Richard Dawkins.

== Reception ==
Nicholas Kristof of The New York Times wrote, "Since Hirsi Ali denounces Islam with a ferocity that I find strident, potentially feeding religious bigotry, I expected to dislike this book. It did leave me uncomfortable and exasperated in places. But I also enjoyed it. Hirsi Ali comes across as so sympathetic when she shares her grief at her family's troubles that she is difficult to dislike. Her memoir suggests that she never quite outgrew her rebellious teenager phase, but also that she would be a terrific conversationalist at a dinner party." Alexander Linklater of The Observer similarly observed, "In Nomad she calls her ancestral voices into direct confrontation with her demands for reform of Islamic theology. The result is electrifying. This is not the same as saying she is always right; but when she calls on western feminists to stand with her, to celebrate the better values of the west, and to confront the worst of the abuses perpetrated on Muslim women, it is not clear what more useful thing those feminists might be doing."

However, Mona Siddiqui, a professor of Islamic studies, was far more critical of the book, opining, "As you read this book two things become obvious. The first is that Hirsi Ali is a woman who had enough courage and determination to escape from a life that her parents wanted for her but which she did not want – something that can be very hard to do in many Islamic cultures. She has been both a victim and a survivor – she lives with death threats. The second is that as a writer she has used her fame, her security issues and her intellectual status to discredit a faith through sweeping generalisations fuelled both by her own experiences but also her own prejudices."

== Censorship ==
Pursuant to the Printing Presses and Publications (Control of Undesirable Publications) (No. 21) Order 2016 dated 18 April 2016 made by the then Minister of Home Affairs of Malaysia, the "printing, importation, production, reproduction, publishing, sale, issue, circulation, distribution or possession" of this book is prohibited as doing so is "likely to be prejudicial to public order and likely to alarm public opinion".
