= Iowa Atheists and Freethinkers =

- Company type: Non-profit organization
- Industry: Education
- Area served: Iowa
- Key people: Jason Benell, President
- Website: https://iowaatheists.org

Iowa Atheists and Freethinkers, Inc. (IAF) is a non-profit 501(c)(3) organization operating in the state of Iowa, United States. It is a social and educational group working to provide a community of support and friendship for atheists, freethinkers, secular humanists, agnostics, and other non-religious people.

The current president is Jason Benell. IAF is a member of Atheist Alliance International, an affiliate of the American Humanist Association and American Atheists, and a partner of the United Coalition of Reason.

== Bus ad campaign controversy ==
In August 2009, IAF sponsored a bus ad campaign, placing advertisements on twenty Des Moines Area Regional Transit (DART) buses. The message of the ads stated "Don't believe in God? You are not alone." However, four days after being installed on the buses, the ads were removed by DART, who cited numerous complaints from people offended by the ads and insisted that the ads had not been approved by the advertising commission before being installed. DART also assured IAF that a refund would be issued for the ads.

On August 6, 2009, Iowa Governor Chet Culver commented on the ad, stating that he "was disturbed personally by the advertisement and [could] understand why other Iowans were also disturbed by the message". The governor's statement heated the controversy, with the governor himself being accused of taking sides, divisiveness, and offensiveness towards the non-theist community. In response, IAF wrote a letter to the governor, expressing regret with his remark and inviting him to one of the organization's meetings.

On the same day, the American Civil Liberties Union questioned the legality of the ad's removal, and requested a review of DART's advertisements policies. Also on August 6, 2009, DART reported that after the incident received media coverage, they received more calls in support of the ad than against it, and proposed that IAF re-design its ad and submit it for DART's consideration.

On the afternoon of August 7, 2009, the DART officials had a meeting with the representatives of the IAF during which IAF refused to consider running an alternate bus ad, stating that the removal of the ads is a freedom of speech issue, while DART agreed to update its advertising policies to "keep pace with [the] progress". Later during the day DART announced that the ads would be restored on the buses in an unaltered form.

As a result of the controversy, IAF membership doubled from what it was before the beginning of the campaign, while DART reported increased interest in bus advertising from other groups, including a religious one.

The controversy, however, re-ignited several days later when a DART driver was suspended for refusing to drive a bus with the IAF's sign, stating that the sign goes against her faith. On August 20, the ad was protested in downtown Des Moines by a local resident, who compared it to "pornography".

In the beginning of September, DART adopted a new, "more open", advertising policy, which required formal approval of any ad's design prior to the signing of the contract.

== 2009 winter bus ad campaign ==
During the 2009 holiday season, IAF launched another bus campaign. The message of the ad was "Being good for goodness' sake". The ad did not generate much controversy and ran without incidents.

== Other activities ==
In January 2010, IAF sent a letter to Iowa legislators, protesting the practice of official prayer at the beginning of each day of the 2010 legislative session. The group maintained that the practice is a violation of the separation of church and state, as well as an unnecessary burden on the Iowa taxpayers, as the clergy members conducting the prayer are reimbursed for the prayer and the mileage, costing the taxpayers over $2,500 per session. Another concern was that the doors to the House and Senate are closed during the prayer, and no one, including the clerks, legislative staff members, and visitors are allowed to get out.

In March 2010, the group protested the screening of "The Truth Project"—a DVD presentation by Focus on the Family, a conservative evangelical Christian organization—in the Iowa State Capitol. The group organized an alternative event at the Capitol, bringing Dr. Hector Avalos, professor of religious studies at Iowa State University, to talk about the evolution of intelligent design—one of the topics covered by the Focus on the Family presentation.

As of 2015, IAF's activities include community outreach and community service efforts with Meet-and-Greets at the Des Moines Farmer's Market, and its annual School Supply Drive to benefit struggling schools within the local district. Also in 2015, Iowa Atheists and Freethinkers was recognized for its activism efforts as the 2014 Affiliate of the Year by American Atheists at their 2015 Annual Convention in Memphis, TN.
