= Pasič, Bosnia and Herzegovina =

Pasič
- Village
- Location within Bosnia and Herzegovina
- Coordinates: 43°36′N 17°02′E
- Country: Bosnia and Herzegovina
- Entity: Federation of Bosnia and Herzegovina
- Canton: Canton 10
- Municipality: Tomislavgrad

Area
  - Total: 10.50 km^{2} (4.05 sq mi)

Population (2013)
  - Total: 250
  - Density: 24/km^{2} (62/sq mi)
- Time zone: UTC+1 (CET)
  - Summer (DST): UTC+2 (CEST)

Pasič is a village in the Municipality of Tomislavgrad in Canton 10 of the Federation of Bosnia and Herzegovina, an entity of Bosnia and Herzegovina. It comprises the following eight hamlets: Blaževići, Ćalušići, Ćurkovići, Dudići, Knezovići, Milardovići, Senikovišće, and Vlaka.

== Demographics ==
According to the 2013 census, its population was 250, all Croats.

== Bibliography ==
- Ethnicity/National Affiliation, Religion and Mother Tongue (PDF). Sarajevo: Agency for Statistics of Bosnia and Herzegovina. 2019.
