= Hirsi Ali Magan =

Puntish scholar

- حرسي مجن عيسى
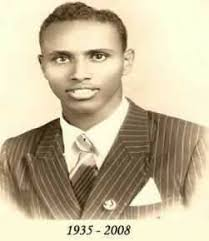
- Born: Hirsi Ali Isse; 1935; Italian Somalia (now Somalia)
- Died: 2008 (aged 72–73); London, England
- Education: Columbia University
- Occupations: Scholar, revolutionary
- Children: 5, including Ayaan Hirsi Ali

Hirsi Ali "Magan" Issa (Somali: Xirsi Cali "Magan" Ciise; Arabic: حرسي علي مجن عيسى, romanized: Ḥirsī ʻAlī Majan ʻĪsā; 1935–2008), commonly known as Hirsi Magan, was a Puntish scholar, intellectual, and political dissident. He was a prominent figure in the Somali Rebellion, Somali culture, and Somalia's political elite. Magan co-founded the Somali Salvation Democratic Front (SSDF), a political and paramilitary group that opposed the government's authoritarian policies, and he was imprisoned for his dissent.

Magan was a comrade-in-arms of erstwhile president of Somalia Abdullahi Yusuf Ahmed, and the father of the former Dutch MP and critic of Islam Ayaan Hirsi Ali.

== Personal life ==
Magan was born in Somalia in 1935 as one of the nine children of Magan Isse Guleid (1845–1945). He was a devout Muslim and student of Somali culture.

=== Family ===
Magan married three times and had four daughters and one son. He had two daughters with his first wife. His second marriage produced son Mahad, daughter Ayaan, and daughter Haweya, the latter of whom died in 1998. He also had a daughter in his third marriage. He later remarried his first wife, who he had divorced shortly after he married his second wife.

Magan Isse studied in Italy and at Columbia University, New York, where he obtained a degree in anthropology. As a trained linguist and anthropologist, he is known as a champion of Osmanya, the Somali writing script invented by Osman Yusuf Kenadid, unlike the former head of state, Siad Barre, who made Shire Jama Ahmed's modified Latin script the national standard in Somalia in 1973.

== Political and military career ==
After the assassination of president Abdirashid Ali Shermarke and Siad Barre coming to power in October, 1969, Magan Isse was considered dangerous to the new leadership and was imprisoned from 1972 to October 1975.

In 1976, Magan Isse escaped from prison and fled from Somalia to Saudi Arabia. Barre banned all political parties with the exception of the Somali Revolutionary Socialist Party (SRSF) the same year and the Somali Democratic Action Front (SODAF; a forerunner of the SSDF) was founded in exile in Rome, Italy. The following year, Magan Isse moved to Ethiopia, where he witnessed the year-long Ogaden War. It was also the period of the Red Terror of the Derg, and its victims included the Western Somali Liberation Front, an Ogaden-based Somali rebel outfit. For security purposes, Magan Isse opted to relocate his family to a suburb in Nairobi, while he continued to live in Somalia and Ethiopia most of the time.

In the summer of 1982, the SSDF played a key role in the second armed conflict between Somalia and Ethiopia. The SSDF, supported by the Derg leader Mengistu's air force, waged a low intensity guerrilla war against the Somali army. Magan Isse became a well-known figure in Somalia at the time as director and presenter of Radio Kulmis (meaning "Unity" in Somali), which aired anti-Barré programs from Addis Abeba, Ethiopia).

In 1988, Magan Isse and Mohamed Haji Aden headed an insurrection near Eyl in the Nugaal region, part of Puntland, mainly inhabited by Majeerteen of the Issa Mahamoud sub-clans. This insurrection of the SSDF, which started in the southern part of Nugaal and Bari and the western part of Mudug, eventually led to the autonomy of the province of Puntland in 1998.

== Later years ==
Magan Isse spent the better part of his later years in political exile in London, England. He died in 2008 at 73 years of age.

== See also ==
- Somali Revolution
- Persecution of the Majeerteen
- Somali Youth League
