= United Coalition of Reason =

- Abbreviation: UnitedCoR
- Formation: 2009
- Type: non-profit
- Legal status: foundation
- Purpose: secularism, atheism
- Headquarters: Washington, D.C.
- Region served: United States
- Official language: English
- Website: unitedcor.org

The United Coalition of Reason, or UnitedCoR for short, is a national organization in the United States that works to raise the visibility of local groups in the community of reason. Nationally this is done by conducting campaigns that highlight the fact that nontheists live in every community across America. Locally this is done by organizing and nurturing local groups to communicate with each other and hold events and other outreach activities.

== History ==
The organization was founded in January 2009 by a philanthropist and entrepreneur from Philadelphia, Pennsylvania. Its first year created a network of twenty local coalitions, drawing worldwide notice. This effort included the sponsoring of several ad/media campaigns around the country such as non-believer billboard and bus ads in Seattle, Washington, and Portland, Oregon. In 2010 the organization launched ten more local coalitions with the help of the American Humanist Association and paved the way for numerous others to launch in 2011. The most significant developments during 2010 were acts of vandalism against billboards or bus ads in Sacramento, California; Detroit, Michigan; and St. Augustine, Florida. Also significant was a call by local clergy in Fort Worth, Texas, for a boycott of the bus system because of ads by the Dallas-Fort Worth Coalition of Reason.

== Goals ==
The organization's website describes four key goals, all achieved without soliciting donations from local leaders or other organizations:

- To promote science and reason, humanist values instead of faith-based reasoning in community and government decision-making,
- To celebrate a global nonreligious philosophy of life and create a safe place for nontheists to speak openly,
- To stand up for the rights of nontheists, ending discrimination and securing a normalized place for them in families, communities, the law, and in public debate,
- And to speak out against the privileges and abuse of religious organizations, while finding common ground with people who express theistic beliefs.

== Participating Coalitions and Locations ==
Although not a full member, the national coalition has endorsed the mission of the Secular Coalition for America. UnitedCoR has itself been endorsed by or has cooperative relations with American Atheists, the American Ethical Union, the American Humanist Association, the Center for Inquiry, the Freedom From Religion Foundation, Atheist Alliance International, the Military Association of Atheists & Freethinkers, the Humanist Society, FreeThoughtAction, the International Humanist and Ethical Union, the Secular Policy Institute, the Association for Mindfulness Meditation and Secular Buddhism, the Richard Dawkins Foundation, the Secular Student Alliance and many others.

The organization has local coalitions all over the United States and in Canada in:

- Mobile, Alabama
- Phoenix, Arizona
- Tucson, Arizona
- Fayetteville, Arkansas
- Little Rock, Arkansas
- Vancouver, British Columbia
- Butte County, California
- Fresno, California
- Los Angeles, California
- Modesto, California
- Orange County, California
- Sacramento, California
- San Diego, California
- San Francisco, California
- San Luis Obispo, California
- Silicon Valley, California
- Stockton, California
- Colorado
- Connecticut
- Washington, DC
- Jacksonville, Florida
- Orlando, Florida
- Pensacola, Florida
- Tallahassee, Florida
- Tampa Bay, Florida
- Atlanta, Georgia
- Boise, Idaho
- Moscow, Idaho
- Chicago, Illinois
- Springfield, Illinois
- Cedar Rapids, Iowa
- Des Moines, Iowa
- Wichita, Kansas
- Lexington, Kentucky
- Louisville, Kentucky
- Boston, Massachusetts
- Baltimore, Maryland
- Detroit, Michigan
- Gulfport, Mississippi
- St. Louis, Missouri
- Kansas City, Missouri
- Springfield, Missouri
- Omaha, Nebraska
- Las Vegas, Nevada
- Reno, Nevada
- New Jersey
- New Mexico
- Asheville, North Carolina
- Charlotte, North Carolina
- The Triad, North Carolina
- The Triangle, North Carolina
- Fargo, North Dakota
- Cincinnati, Ohio
- Cleveland, Ohio
- Columbus, Ohio
- Oklahoma City, Oklahoma
- Tulsa, Oklahoma
- Portland, Oregon
- Philadelphia, Pennsylvania
- Pittsburgh, Pennsylvania
- Rhode Island
- Columbia, South Carolina
- Greenville, South Carolina
- South Dakota
- Austin, Texas
- Bryan-College Station, Texas
- Corpus Christi, Texas
- Dallas, Texas
- Houston, Texas
- San Antonio, Texas
- Salt Lake City, Utah
- Fredericksburg, Virginia
- Roanoke, Virginia
- Pullman, Washington
- Richland, Washington
- Seattle, Washington
- Spokane, Washington
- Morgantown, West Virginia
- Madison, Wisconsin

== See also ==
- American Humanist Association
- Center for Inquiry
- Secular Student Alliance
- Freedom From Religion Foundation
- List of secularist organizations
- Secular movement
