= Heretic: Why Islam Needs a Reformation Now =

2015 book by Ayaan Hirsi Ali

- Cover of the first edition
- Author: Ayaan Hirsi Ali
- Language: English
- Subject: Criticism of Islam
- Publisher: Harper
- Publication date: 2015
- Media type: Print
- Pages: 288
- ISBN: 978-0062333933
- Preceded by: Nomad: From Islam to America

Heretic: Why Islam Needs a Reformation Now, also published as Heretic: Why Islam Must Change to Join the Modern World, is a 2015 book by Ayaan Hirsi Ali, in which the author advocates that a Muslim reformation is the only way to end the horrors of terrorism, sectarian warfare and the repression of women and minorities.

== Contents ==
Hirsi Ali stresses the necessity of recognising that certain Islamic sacred texts can provide justifications for violence and oppression. The only way to prevent fundamentalists from effectively pressurising other Muslims to put such exhortations into practice, is to abandon the claims that the Quran is the literal and infallible word of God. This would require a reinvention of the Muslim identity.

The current situation within Islam is portrayed by Hirsi Ali as a struggle between three main factions:

- "Mecca Muslims", the majority, who are generally tolerant and passive, and reflect the times of Muhammad's early leadership in Mecca (610–622 CE)
- "Medina Muslims", the jihadist minority, who seek to impose an authoritarian version of Islam upon society through violence and coercion, as Muhammad did during his rise in Medina (622–629 CE).
- "Modifying Muslims" (or "Heretics", hence the title), the dissident and reformist minority, who actively challenge religious dogma and seek to make the religion truly tolerant and modern.

The latter two groups are trying to recruit the Mecca Muslims to their cause; Hirsi Ali herself takes the side of the Modifying Muslims.

As a programme for the Modifying Muslims, Hirsi Ali proposes Five Theses for Islamic Reformation:

1. Ensure that Muhammad and the Quran are open to interpretation and criticism.
2. Give priority to this life, not the afterlife.
3. Shackle sharia and end its supremacy over secular law.
4. End the practice of "commanding right, forbidding wrong".
5. Abandon the call to jihad.

The book further elaborates on the claim that, and the question how this conversation needs to be had, and that fundamentalists often try to shut dialogue down because of their notions of Islam's perfection and unchangeability, thus preventing the reforms that Hirsi Ali deems crucial from taking place.

== Reception ==
Despite noting that "[Ali] loses the reader's trust with overblown rhetoric," Susan Dominus of The New York Times remarked, "Unquestionably, Hirsi Ali poses challenging questions about whether American liberals should be fighting harder for the rights of Muslim women in countries where they are oppressed, and she is fearless in using shock tactics to jump-start a conversation. [...] There is no denying that her words are brave. Whether they are persuasive is another matter."

Andrew Anthony of The Guardian wrote, "Even her fiercest detractors would struggle to deny much of what Hirsi Ali states about the current predicament within Islam. Unfortunately that doesn't make it any more palatable, particularly in an era dominated by the modern commandment not to offend anyone." He added, "Whatever one may think of her solutions, Hirsi Ali should be commended for her unblinking determination to address the problem."

== See also ==
- Islam and the Future of Tolerance, a 2015 book by Maajid Nawaz and Sam Harris on the same topic
