= Birol Emir =

Turkish-American statistician

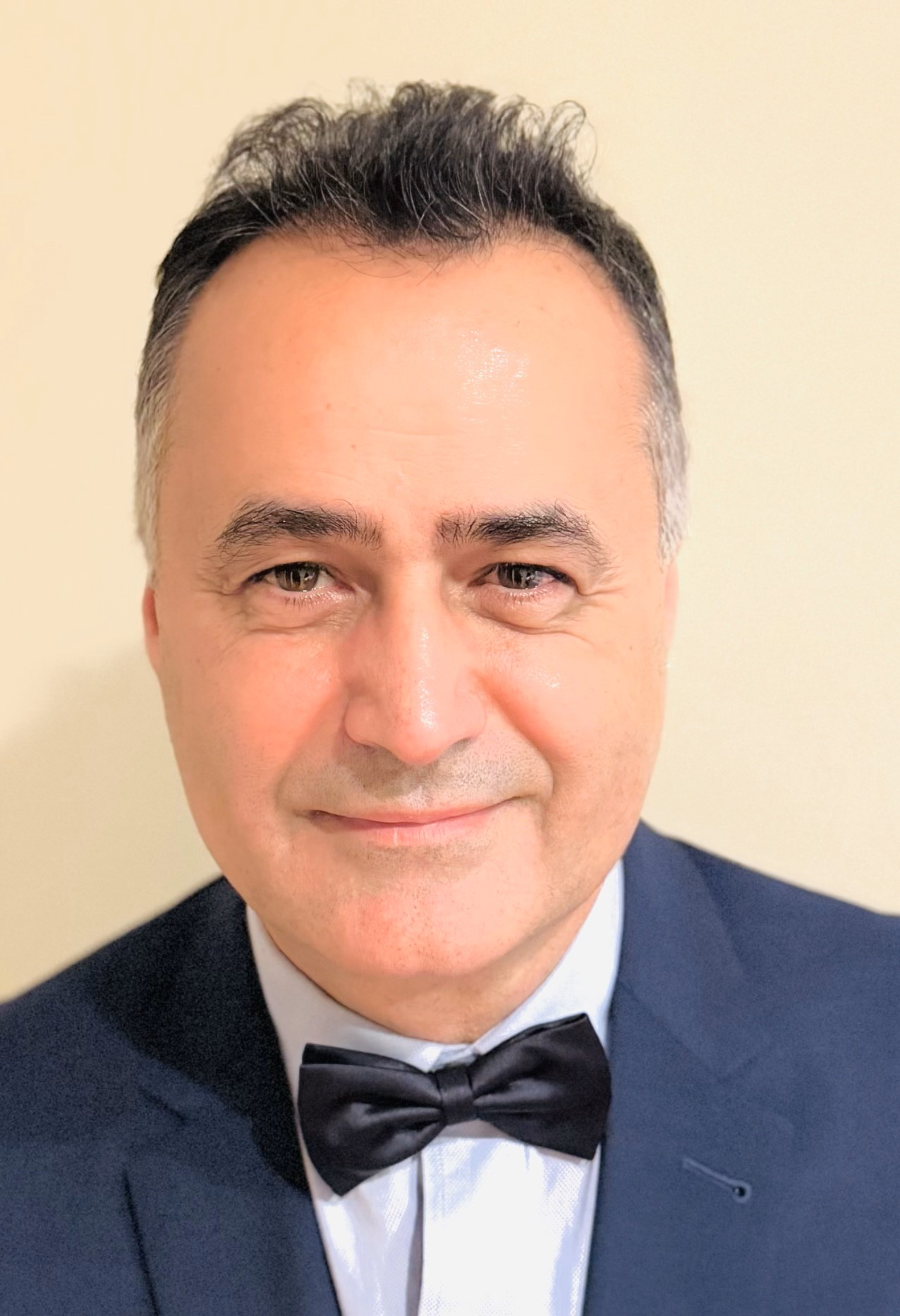
- Born: 1966
- Education: Middle East Technical University (B.S.) Iowa State University (M.S., Ph.D.)
- Occupation: Statistician

Birol Emir (born 1966) is a Turkish-American statistician. He is an Executive Director and head of Real-World Evidence Statistics. at Pfizer Inc.. He has been serving as an adjunct professor of statistics and lecturer of Applied Analytics at Columbia University in New York City. Additionally, he serves as an external committee member of the Graduate School of Arts and Science for the Ph.D. degree at Rutgers University.

== Education ==
Birol grew up in Turkiye and graduated from Middle East Technical University with a B.S. with Honors. He earned his M.S. and Ph.D. in statistics from Iowa State University. He completed post-doctoral work for the National Surgical Adjuvant Breast and Bowel Project at the University of Pittsburgh Medical Center.

== Research and Career ==
Birol's areas of research and professional expertise lie in causal inference, real-world evidence generation, predictive modeling, big data, and clinical trials. He co-authored the book Interface Between Regulation and Statistics in Drug Development, co-edited the book Statistical Topics in Healthcare Economics and Outcomes Research, and authored a chapter in A Picture is Worth a Thousand Tables: Graphics in Life Sciences

=== Awards and honors ===
Birol was elected as a Fellow of the American Statistical Association (ASA) in 2024.
