= Atilla Taş =

Turkish man singer (born 1975)

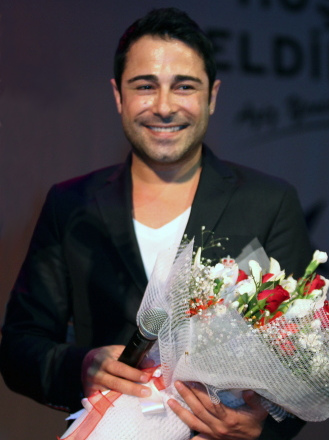
- Taş in 2012
- Born: 4 February 1975 (age 51); Ceyhan, Adana, Turkey
- Education: New York Film Academy
- Occupations: Singer; actor; TV presenter; columnist
- Spouse(s): İlkay Sarıköse (m. 1991–?) Meryem Güler (m. 2016)
- Children: 1
- Musical career
- Genre: Pop
- Years active: 1998–present
- Labels: Erol Köse; Seyhan

Atilla Taş (born 4 February 1975) is a Turkish singer.

== Career ==
His first album Kırmızılım was released in 1998, with "Ham Çökelek" released as a popular single.

In October 2012, Taş's release of a cover of Gangnam Style called Yamyam Style (Cannibal Style) caused some Turkish social media outlets to claim in jest that Taş was actually Greek and named "Athillas Thasos". This jesting continued in 2013 when an online petition proposed that Taş should be selected to represent Turkey at Eurovision, as Turkey has withdrawn from that competition over dissatisfaction with its rules.

Taş also drew front-page headlines in Turkey in 1999 when it was reported that he knew how David Copperfield performed one of his illusions.

In February 2014, a humorous video project Taş did with Samsung received over one million views in two days.

== Arrest and Detention ==
Taş, who had posted satirical tweets about Turkey's president Recep Tayyip Erdoğan, was arrested along with 28 other people in September 2016 for alleged membership in "an armed terrorist organization". Although a court ordered his release on 31 March 2017, the decision was reversed after an appeal by the prosecutor. He was held in pre-trial detention for a total of one year, one month and 21 days. On 8 March 2018 he was sentenced to 3 years, 1 month and 15 days of imprisonment. In January 2021, the European Court of Human Rights found his pre-trial detention unlawful and arbitrary.

== Discography ==
Studio albums

- Kırmızılım (1998)
- Emmilenyum (2000)
- Pembeli (2001)
- Kınalı Kuzum (2004)
- Bir Atilla Taş Albümü (2007)
- Çikolata (2009)

Remix albums

- Atilla Taş (1999)

Singles

- "Yam Yam Style" (2012)
- "Hırsız" (2015)

== Filmography ==
Television

- Zilyoner (1999)
- Şöhretler Kebapçısı (2003)
- Arkadaşım Hoşgeldin (2014)

His own programs

- Müzik Kutusu (2010)
- Taş Devri (2011–12)
- Ben Burdan Atlarım (2012–13)

== Books ==
- Bir Delinin Kapak Defteri (2015)
