= İnci Sözlük =

Turkish online forum

Inci Sözlük
- Old logo design
- Company type: Private
- Website type: Internet Forum
- Available in: Turkish
- Headquarters: Maltepe, Istanbul
- Owners: Serkan İnci, İsmail Alpen
- Website: http://inci.sozlukspot.com
- Advertising: Banner ads
- Commercial: Yes
- Registration: Required to post
- Users: 1,142,331
- Launched: December 9, 2009; 13 years ago
- Current status: Active

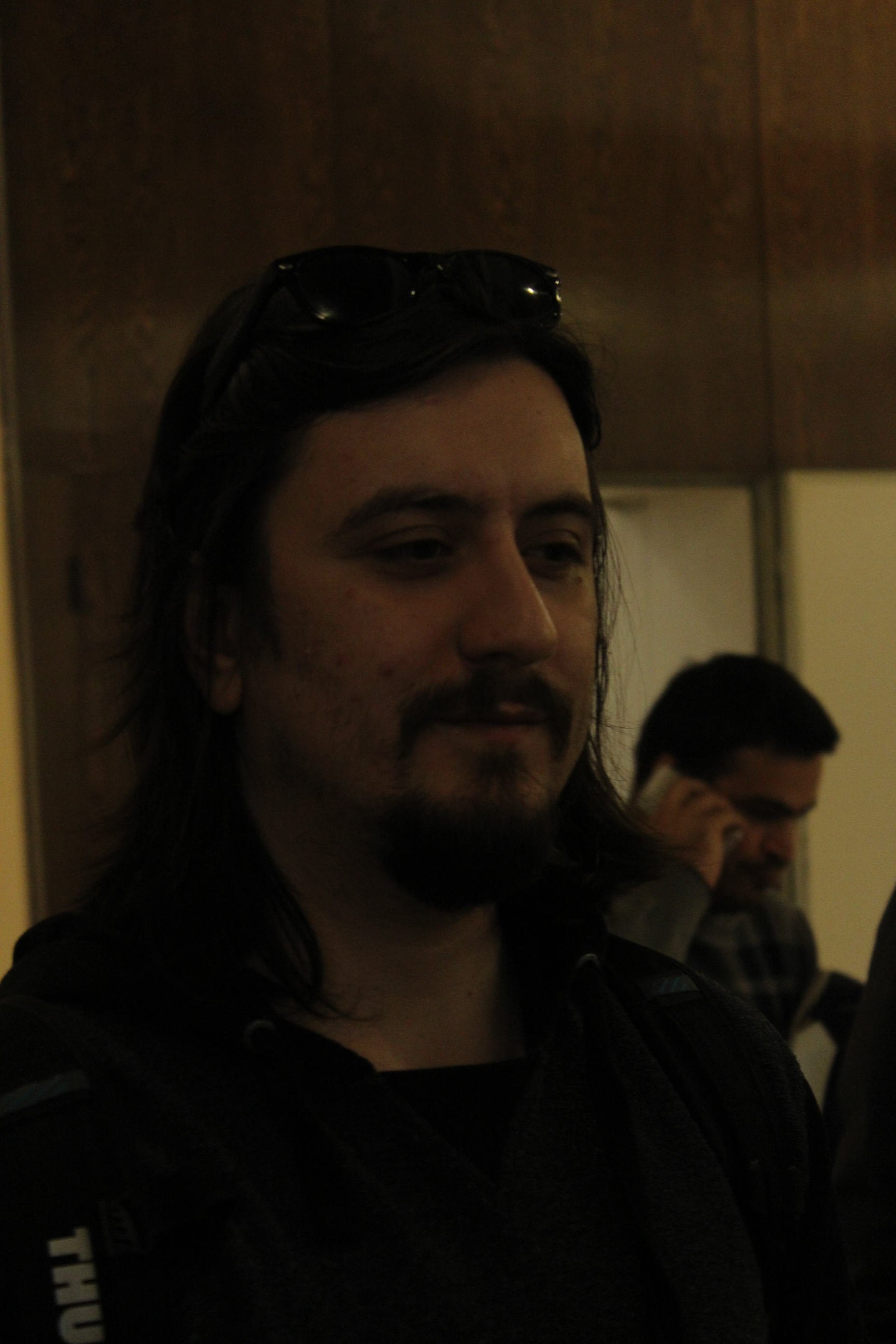
Serkan İnci, founder of the website

İnci Sözlük, also spelt İncisözlük, is a Turkish-language Internet forum. Founded by Serkan İnci and İsmail Alpen in December 2009, the site hosts boards dedicated to a wide variety of topics, from sports, games, cooking, television, politics and religion, among others. Registered users submit content to the site such as links, text posts, images, and videos. Submissions with more upvotes appear towards site's front page.

The website is often compared to 4chan and regarded as the Turkish equivalent of it. As of February 22, 2023, the website has over 1 million users.

== History ==
On the official webpage of the community there are "stars" for famous pranks that they organized. They were the first to announce an anomaly in Twitter's code on May 10, 2010. Unscrupulous users were able to exploit this bug to add unconfirmed users to members' "following" list.

The community also abused the translation function of facebook by mass-voting for dirty and suggestive translations.

The community is also widely Blamed for the hoax regarding Atilla Taş, a Turkish pop singer who they started labelling as Greek named "Athillas Thasos" after the release of his Gangnam Style parody "Yam Yam Style", which was widely criticised in Turkey, in order to put the blame on Greeks.

In April 2011, Adnan Oktar took the website to court after he was confronted with what he considered to be defamation about him on the website.
