= AHA Foundation =

Nonprofit organization for women's rights

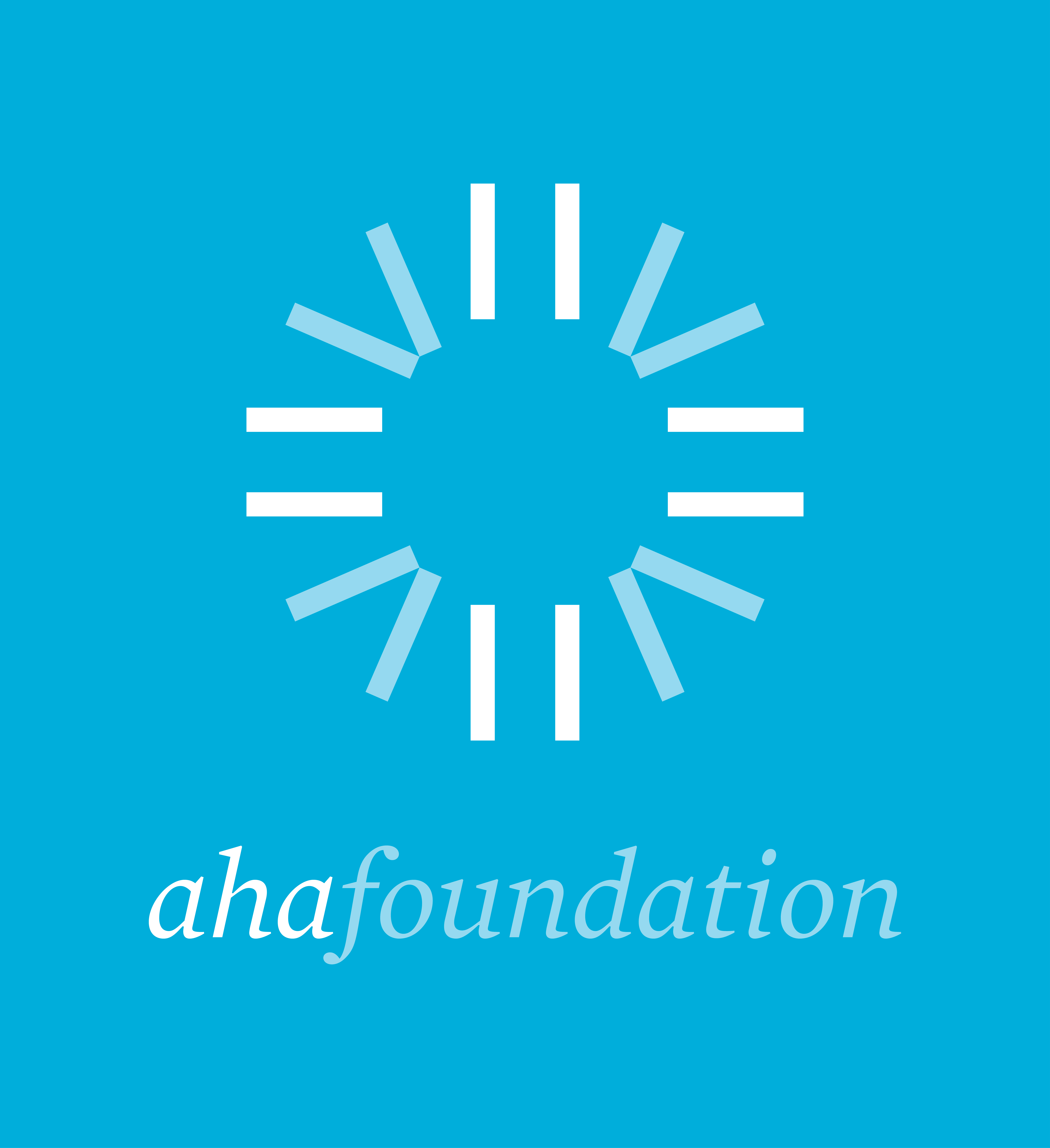
- Founded: 2007
- Founder: Ayaan Hirsi Ali
- Type: 501(c)(3) charitable organization
- Purpose: Women's Rights, Freedom Of Speech
- Location: Bethesda, Maryland
- Method: Investigate, Inform, Influence and Intervene
- Website: theahafoundation.org

The AHA Foundation is American nonprofit organization founded by Ayaan Hirsi Ali, its namesake. The organizations stated goal is to protect Western Freedoms and Ideals, especially from the threat of, what it considers, Islamic extremism. It was founded by Ayaan Hirsi Ali in 2007 and is based in New York City. Originally formed to support ex-Muslims who had suffered for their religious or political beliefs, the organization's scope was broadened September 2008 to focus on women's rights. The goal of the AHA Foundation is to combat crimes against women and girls such as child marriage, forced marriages, female genital mutilation and honor killings. Its key activities include education, outreach and legislative advocacy.

== Criticism ==
The Council of American Islamic Relations supports AHA's goal of defending women's rights, but says that its founder unfairly maligns all Muslims. For example, it points out that Ayaan Hirsi Ali has called Islam a "nihilistic cult of death".
