= Inci Y. =

Turkish German writer (born 1970)

Inci Y. (born 1970) is a Turkish German woman, a pseudonymous author about the life of a Turkish woman in Germany. She wrote her books with a cooperation with German journalist Jochen Faust.

== Biography ==
Inci Y. was born in Germany to a Turkish gastarbeiter family. After spending her childhood in Ankara, she returned to Germany at the age of 11. At the age of 16 she was forced into marriage and divorced 10 years later. Later she entered another forced marriage.As of 2005, she was an unskilled worker living with her children in a small German town.

== Books ==
- 2005: (With Jochen Faust), Erstickt an euren Lügen. Eine Türkin in Deutschland erzählt [ Suffocated by Your Lies: A Turkish Woman in Germany Tells Her Story], Munich, Piper Verlag, ISBN 9783492047944
  The book describes the experience of Inci in her forced marriage. A reviewer from Neue Zürcher Zeitung made two comments: Inci Y. makes it clear that "education is the key" for independent life and that she does not blame Islamic faith for her troubles.

- 2010: Turkish translation: Yalanlarınızda Boğuldum, publisher: Erko Yayıncılık, ISBN 9789944338639

- 2007: (With Jochen Faust), Erzähl mir nix von Unterschicht. Die Geschichte einer Türkin in Deutschland [Don't tell me about the underclass: The story of a Turkish woman in Germany], Piper, ISBN 9783492051330
  The book continues the story of Inci, who tries to escape the lower class, repeating the message from the first book: lack of opportunities for uneducated people. The rewiever writes: "The book documents a failed integration. Whether this was ultimately due to German immigration and foreigner laws, rigid enforcement regulations in government offices, the shameless exploitation of legal residency conditions by landlords and employers, or whether Inci Y. ultimately failed due to her own shortcomings, this assessment is left to the reader's judgment."
