= Taida Pasić =

Taida Pasić (Serbian Cyrillic: Таида Пасић) (born 10 April 1987 in Pristina, Yugoslavia) became famous as a result of the circumstances arising from her application for temporary stay in the Netherlands.

Pasić was born in Pristina, Yugoslav province of Kosovo (present-day Kosovo). As a result of the Kosovo War, her family fled Kosovo in 1999 to the Netherlands, where she spent the remainder of her childhood and became fluent in Dutch. Her family's applications for refugee status were repeatedly rejected, and in 2005 her family accepted a one-time payment to be resettled in Kosovo. She returned to the Netherlands in January 2006 on a French tourist visa, intending to complete her final months of high school.

Pasić was arrested by immigration police while at school in March 2006, and the ensuing political controversy about her alien detention and the actions taken by Dutch integration minister Rita Verdonk became a major issue in Dutch politics, leading indirectly to the resignation and temporary loss of citizenship of Ayaan Hirsi Ali and the fall of the second Balkenende cabinet. In her memoir, Infidel, Hirsi Ali claims to have privately urged Pasić's case and to have told Verdonk that she herself had lied on her asylum application - something that Verdonk denies.

On 28 April 2006, Pasić left the Netherlands for Bosnia, and took her exams in the Dutch embassy in Sarajevo. In August 2006 she became a student at the University of Leiden. In 2010 she graduated in civil law at Leiden University and was a member of student fraternity LSV Minerva. In 2011, she joined the law firm NautaDutilh in Amsterdam as a trainee lawyer. Since 2014 till the end 2018 she has been working at the NautaDutilh office in New York. Now she works at Dept Digital Marketing in Amsterdam.
