= İnci Birol =

Turkish belly dancer and actress (1933–2022)

- Born: Asiye Yurdagül Ergin; January 1, 1933; Istanbul, Turkey
- Died: June 11, 2022 (aged 89); Istanbul, Turkey
- Occupations: Belly dancer, actress
- Years active: 1945–1970s
- Partner: Fahrettin Aslan
- Children: 2

İnci Birol (born Asiye Yurdagül Ergin; 1 January 1933 – 11 June 2022) was a Turkish belly dancer and actress who rose to prominence during the 1950s and 1960s. She was a prominent figure in Turkish Oryantal dans and played a significant role in the early development of the Turkish entertainment industry, gaining recognition for her performances in both cinema and dance venues across the Middle East.

== Early life and dance career ==
İnci Birol was born in Istanbul in 1933. She began dancing professionally at the age of 12 in Aleppo, Syria. Using the stage name "Asiye", she toured major cities across the Middle East and North Africa including Damascus, Baghdad, Cairo, and Casablanca.

Her energetic style and command of rhythm made her one of the most sought-after performers of her time. She was part of a generation of Turkish dancers who contributed to the popularisation of oriental dance both domestically and internationally.

== Film career ==
By the mid-1950s, Birol transitioned into Turkish cinema, appearing in several Yeşilçam productions. Her film roles often showcased her dancing skills and charisma.

Her selected filmography includes:

- Fındıkçı Gelin (1954)
- Kara Çalı (1956)
- Bir Yavrunun Gözyaşları (1960)
- Mor Sevda (1961)
- Ver Elini İstanbul (1962)

== Personal life ==
In the early 1960s, Birol began a relationship with Fahrettin Aslan, a prominent figure in Istanbul's nightlife industry. They had twin daughters, Esra and Esin. Although they never formally married, Aslan acknowledged the children and gave them his surname.

== Death ==
İnci Birol died on 11 June 2022 in Istanbul after a battle with liver cancer. She was buried following funeral services at Teşvikiye Mosque.

== Legacy ==
Birol is regarded as one of the early pioneers of Turkish belly dance in film and live performance, bridging traditional dance with popular entertainment. Her work contributed to the visibility of oriental dance within Turkey’s evolving entertainment industry in the mid-20th century.
