= Ayaan Hirsi Ali =

Somali-born activist, politician, and author (born 1969)

- Ayaan Xirsi Cali
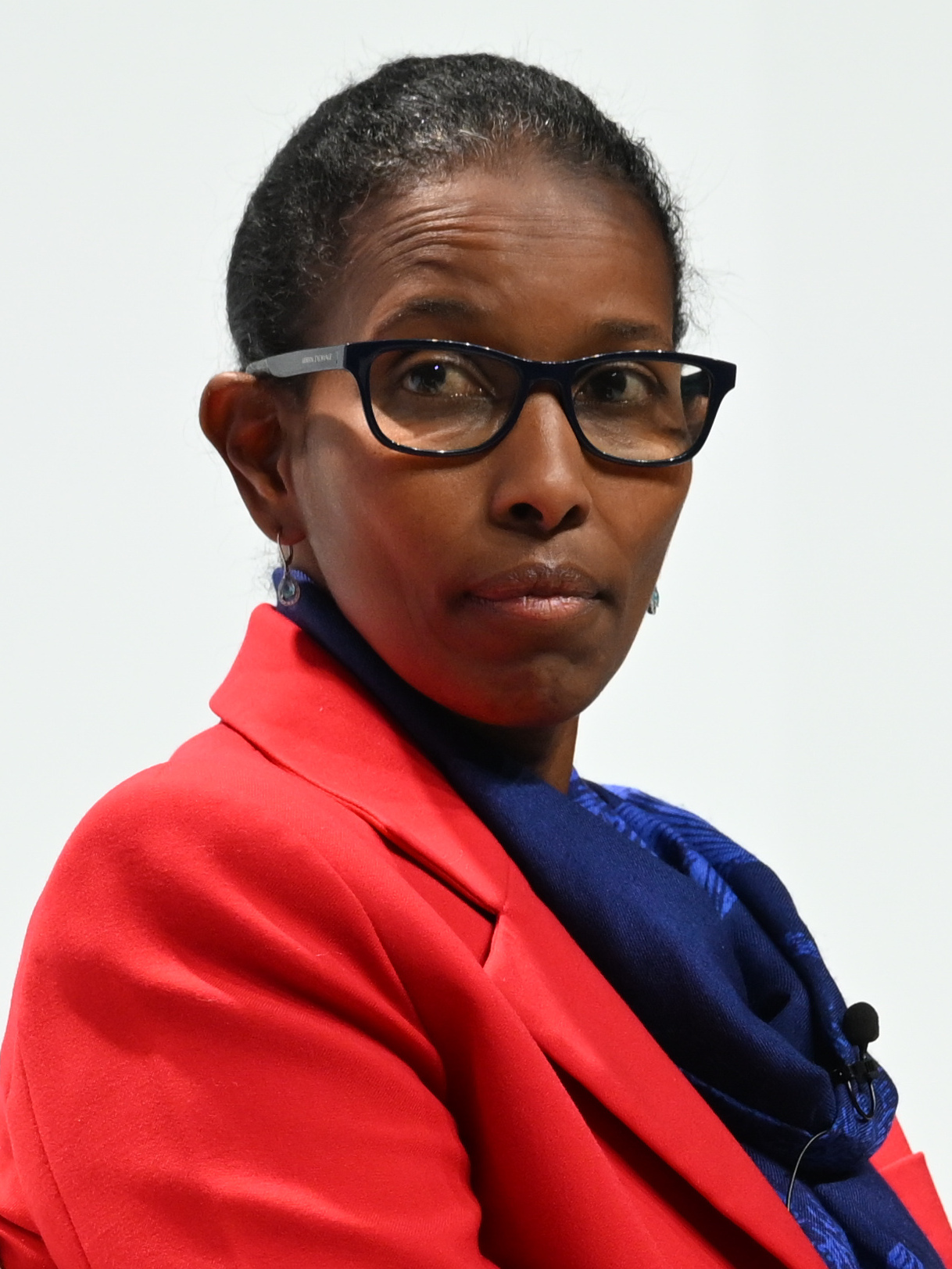
- Hirsi Ali in 2023
- Born: Ayaan Hirsi Magan; 13 November 1969 (age 57); Mogadishu, Somali Democratic Republic
- Citizenship: Somalia (until 1997); Netherlands (since 1997); United States (since 2013)
- Education: Hogeschool De Horst (HBO-P); Leiden University (MSc)
- Occupations: Politician; author
- Employer(s): American Enterprise Institute; Harvard University; Hoover Institution, Stanford University
- Organization: AHA Foundation
- Known for: Women's rights advocacy; criticism of female genital mutilation; criticism of Islam; criticism of Islamism
- Notable work: The Caged Virgin; Infidel: My Life; Nomad: From Islam to America
- Political party: Labour Party (2001–2002); People's Party for Freedom and Democracy (2002–2006)
- Spouse: Niall Ferguson (m. 2011)
- Children: 2

Member of the House of Representatives
- In office 2003–2006
- Website: ayaanhirsiali.com

Ayaan Hirsi Ali, (Note: English: /ɑːˈjɑːn ˈhɪərsi ˈɑːli/ ah-YAHN HEER-see AH-lee; Dutch: [aːˈjaːn ˈɦiːrsi ˈaːli]; Somali: Ayaan Xirsi Cali [ajaːn ħirsi ʕaliː]; Arabic: أيان حرسي علي, ALA-LC: Ayān Ḥirsī ʻAlī.) Lady Ferguson (Somali: Ayaan Xirsi Cali; born Ayaan Hirsi Magan, 13 November 1969) is a Somali-born Dutch-American writer, activist, and former politician.

Hirsi Ali was born in the Somali Democratic Republic. At the age of five, Hirsi Ali underwent female genital mutilation organized by her grandmother. Her family moved across various countries in Africa and the Middle East, and at 23, she received political asylum in the Netherlands, gaining Dutch citizenship five years later. In her early 30s, Hirsi Ali renounced the religious beliefs of her childhood, began identifying as an atheist, and became involved in Dutch centre-right politics, joining the People's Party for Freedom and Democracy (VVD).

In 2003, Hirsi Ali was elected to the lower house of the States General of the Netherlands. While serving in parliament, she collaborated on a short film with Theo van Gogh, titled Submission, which depicted the oppression of women under fundamentalist Islamic law and was critical of the Muslim canon itself. The film led to death threats, and Van Gogh was murdered shortly after the film's release by Mohammed Bouyeri, driving Hirsi Ali into hiding. At this time, she became more outspoken as a critic of Islam. In 2005, Time magazine named Hirsi Ali as one of the 100 most influential people in the world. Her outspoken criticism of Islam made her a controversial figure in Dutch politics.

Moving to the United States, Hirsi Ali joined the American Enterprise Institute (AEI) think tank, where she established herself as a writer, activist, and public intellectual. Her books Infidel: My Life (2007), Nomad: From Islam to America (2010) and Heretic: Why Islam Needs a Reformation Now (2015) became bestsellers.

Ali was a central figure in New Atheism from its beginnings. She announced her conversion to Christianity in 2023. Non-Western critics have accused Hirsi Ali of adhering to alleged ideologies of "Islamophobia" or "neo-orientalism" and have questioned her scholarly credentials "to speak authoritatively about Islam and the Arab world", saying she promotes the notion of a supposed Western "civilizing mission". Hirsi Ali is married to Scottish-American historian Niall Ferguson. The couple are raising their sons in the United States, where she became a citizen on 25 April 2013.

== Early life ==
Hirsi Ali was born Ayaan Hirsi Magan in Mogadishu, Somali Democratic Republic, on 13 November 1969. Her father, Hirsi Magan Isse, was a Sunni Muslim of Somalia's Darod clan who had attended Columbia University in New York. A prominent member of the Somali Salvation Democratic Front and a leading figure in the Somali Revolution, her father was imprisoned due to his opposition to Siad Barre's Communist government the year Ayaan was born. Hirsi Ali's father was an intellectual, a dissident and a devout Muslim who had studied abroad and he was opposed to female genital mutilation; while he was imprisoned, Hirsi Ali's grandmother had a man perform the procedure on her, when Hirsi Ali was five years old. According to Hirsi Ali, she was fortunate that her grandmother could not find a woman to do the procedure, as the mutilation was "much milder" when performed by men.

After her father escaped from prison, he and the family left Somalia, going to Saudi Arabia, Ethiopia, and finally Kenya, where they lived for ten years. There he established a comfortable upper-middle-class life for them. Hirsi Ali attended the English-language Muslim Girls' Secondary School. By the time she reached her teens, Saudi Arabia was funding religious education in numerous countries and its religious views were becoming influential among many Muslims. A charismatic religious teacher, trained under this aegis, joined Hirsi Ali's school. She inspired the teenage Ayaan, as well as some fellow students, to adopt the more rigorous Saudi Arabian interpretations of Islam, as opposed to the more relaxed versions then current in Somalia and Kenya. Hirsi Ali said later that she had long been impressed by the Qur'an and had lived "by the Book, for the Book" throughout her childhood.

She sympathised with the views of the Islamist Muslim Brotherhood, and wore a hijab with her school uniform. This was unusual at the time but has become more common among some young Muslim women. At the time, she agreed with the fatwa proclaimed against British Indian writer Salman Rushdie in reaction to the portrayal of the Islamic prophet Muhammad in his novel The Satanic Verses. After completing secondary school, Hirsi Ali attended a secretarial course at Valley Secretarial College in Nairobi for one year. As she was growing up, she also read English-language adventure stories, such as the Nancy Drew series and Enid Blyton novels, with modern heroine archetypes who pushed the limits of society. She recalled, "Secret Seven, Famous Five and some of the other Enid Blytons – what they do is, they encourage you as an individual to imagine that you're a part of the Secret Seven. You're solving mysteries, you're a part of the Famous Five. So that's very different from the world I grew up in, where you are told, 'Stay inside the house. Do not mingle with boys.' " Also, remembering her grandmother refusing soldiers entry into her house, Hirsi Ali associated with Somalia "the picture of strong women: the one who smuggles in the food, and the one who stands there with a knife against the army and says, 'You cannot come into the house.' And I became like that. And my parents and my grandmother don't appreciate that now – because of what I've said about the Qur'an. I have become them, just in a different way."

== Life in the Netherlands ==
=== Arrival and education ===
Hirsi Ali arrived in the Netherlands in 1992. That year she had travelled from Kenya to visit family in Düsseldorf and Bonn, Germany, and gone to the Netherlands to escape an alleged forced marriage. Once there, she requested political asylum and obtained a residence permit. She used her paternal grandfather's early surname on her application and has since been known in the West as Ayaan Hirsi Ali. She received a residence permit within three or four weeks of arriving in the Netherlands.

At first, she held various short-term jobs, ranging from cleaning to sorting post. She worked as a translator at a Rotterdam refugee center which, according to a friend interviewed in 2006 by The Observer newspaper, marked her deeply.

As an avid reader, in the Netherlands she found new books and ways of thought that both stretched her imagination and frightened her. Sigmund Freud's work introduced her to an alternative moral system that was not based on religion. During this time she took courses in Dutch and a one-year introductory course in social work at the Hogeschool De Horst in Driebergen. She has said that she was impressed with how well Dutch society seemed to function. To better understand its development, she studied at the Leiden University, where she obtained a Master's degree in political science.

Between 1995 and 2001, Hirsi Ali also worked as an independent Somali-Dutch interpreter and translator, frequently working with Somali women in asylum centers, hostels for abused women, and at the Dutch immigration and naturalization service (IND, Immigratie- en Naturalisatiedienst). While working for the IND, she became critical of the way it handled asylum seekers. Hirsi Ali speaks six languages: English, Somali, and Dutch.

=== Political career ===
After gaining her degree, Hirsi Ali became a Fellow at the Wiardi Beckman Stichting (WBS), a think tank of the center-left Labour Party (PvdA). Leiden University Professor Ruud Koole was steward of the party. Hirsi Ali's writing at the WBS was inspired by the work of the neoconservative Orientalist Bernard Lewis.

She became disenchanted with Islam and was shocked by the September 11 attacks in the United States in 2001, for which al-Qaeda eventually claimed responsibility. After listening to videotapes of Osama bin Laden citing "words of justification" in the Qur'an for the attacks, she wrote, "I picked up the Qur'an and the hadith and started looking through them, to check. I hated to do it, because I knew that I would find Bin Laden's quotations in there." During this time of transition, she came to regard the Qur'an as relative – it was a historical record and "just another book."

Reading Atheïstisch manifest ("Atheist Manifesto") of Leiden University philosopher Herman Philipse helped to convince her to give up religion. She renounced Islam and acknowledged her disbelief in God in 2002. She began to formulate her critique of Islam and Islamic culture, published many articles on these topics, and became a frequent speaker on television news programs and in public debate forums. She discussed her ideas at length in a book titled De zoontjesfabriek (The Son Factory) (2002). In this period, she first began to receive death threats.

Cisca Dresselhuys, editor of the feminist magazine Opzij, introduced Hirsi Ali to Gerrit Zalm, the parliamentary leader of the centre-right People's Party for Freedom and Democracy (VVD), and party member Neelie Kroes, then European Commissioner for Competition. At their urging, Hirsi Ali decided to switch her party membership and joined the VVD, on whose list she also stood for election to the States General of the Netherlands. Between November 2002 and January 2003, she lived abroad while on the payroll as an assistant of the VVD.

In 2003, aged 33, Hirsi Ali successfully fought a parliamentary election. She said that the Dutch welfare state had overlooked abuse of Muslim women and girls in the Netherlands and their social needs, contributing to their isolation and oppression.

During her tenure in Parliament, Hirsi Ali continued her criticisms of Islam and many of her statements provoked controversy. In an interview in the Dutch newspaper Trouw, she said that by Western standards, Muhammad as represented in the Qu'ran would be considered a pedophile. A religious discrimination complaint was filed against her on 24 April 2003 by Muslims who objected to her statements. The Prosecutor's office decided not to initiate a case, because her critique did "not put forth any conclusions in respect to Muslims and their worth as a group is not denied".

=== Film with Theo van Gogh ===
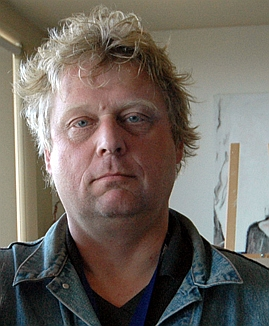
Theo van Gogh

Working with writer and director Theo van Gogh, Hirsi Ali wrote the script and provided the voice-over for Submission (2004), a short film that criticised the treatment of women in Islamic society. Juxtaposed with passages from the Qur'an were scenes of actresses portraying Muslim women suffering abuse. An apparently nude actress dressed in a semi-transparent burqa was shown with texts from the Qur'an written on her skin. These texts are among those often interpreted as justifying the subjugation of Muslim women. The film's release sparked outrage among many Dutch Muslims.

Mohammed Bouyeri, a 26-year-old Dutch Moroccan Islamist and member of the Muslim terrorist organisation Hofstad Group, assassinated Van Gogh in an Amsterdam street on 2 November 2004. Bouyeri shot Van Gogh with a handgun eight times, first from a distance and then at short range as the director lay wounded on the ground. He was already dead when Bouyeri cut his throat with a large knife and tried to decapitate him. Bouyeri left a letter pinned to Van Gogh's body with a small knife; it was primarily a death threat to Hirsi Ali. The Dutch secret service immediately raised the level of security they provided to Hirsi Ali. Bouyeri was sentenced to life imprisonment without parole.

In 2004, a rap song about Hirsi Ali titled "Hirsi Ali Dis" was produced and distributed on the internet by a group called "The Hague Connection". The lyrics included violent threats against her life. The rappers were prosecuted under Article 121 of the Dutch criminal code because they hindered Hirsi Ali's execution of her work as a politician. In 2005 they were sentenced to community service and a suspended prison sentence.

Hirsi Ali went into hiding, aided by government security services, who moved her among several locations in the Netherlands. They moved her to the United States for several months. On 18 January 2005, she returned to parliament. On 18 February 2005, she revealed where she and her colleague Geert Wilders were living. She demanded a normal, secured house, which she was granted one week later.

In January 2006, Hirsi Ali was recognised as "European of the Year" by Reader's Digest, an American magazine. In her speech, she urged action to prevent Iran from developing nuclear weapons. She also said that Mahmoud Ahmadinejad should be taken at his word in wanting to organise a conference to investigate objective evidence of the Holocaust, noting that the subject is not taught in the Middle East. She said, "Before I came to Europe, I'd never heard of the Holocaust. That is the case with millions of people in the Middle East. Such a conference should be able to convince many people away from their denial of the genocide against the Jews." She also said that what some have described as "Western values" of freedom and justice were universal. But she thought that Europe has done far better than most areas of the world in providing justice, as it has guaranteed the freedom of thought and debate required for critical self-examination. She said communities cannot reform unless "scrupulous investigation of every former and current doctrine is possible." Hirsi Ali was nominated as a candidate for the Nobel Peace Prize the same month by Norwegian parliamentarian Christian Tybring-Gjedde.

In March 2006, she co-signed a letter titled "MANIFESTO: Together facing the new totalitarianism". Among the eleven other signatories was Salman Rushdie; as a teenager, Hirsi Ali had supported the fatwa against him. The letter was published in response to protests in the Islamic world surrounding the Jyllands-Posten Muhammad cartoons controversy in Denmark, and it supported freedom of press and freedom of expression.

On 27 April 2006, a Dutch judge ruled that Hirsi Ali had to abandon her current secure house at a secret address in the Netherlands. Her neighbors had complained that she created an unacceptable security risk, but the police had testified that this neighborhood was one of the safest places in the country, as they had many personnel assigned to it for Hirsi Ali's protection. In an interview in early 2007, Hirsi Ali noted that the Dutch state had spent about €3.5 million on her protection; threats against her produced fear, but she believed it important to speak her mind. While regretting Van Gogh's death, she said she was proud of their work together.

A private trust, the Foundation for Freedom of Expression, was established in 2007 in the Netherlands to help fund protection of Hirsi Ali and other Muslim dissidents.

=== Dutch citizenship controversy ===
In May 2006, the TV programme Zembla reported that Hirsi Ali had given false information about her name, her age, and her country of residence when originally applying for asylum, in a documentary called "The Holy Ayaan". In her asylum application, she had claimed to be fleeing a forced marriage, but the Zembla coverage featured interviews with her family, who denied that claim. The program alleged that, contrary to Hirsi Ali's claims of having fled a Somali war zone, the MP had been living comfortably in upper middle-class conditions safely in Kenya with her family for at least 12 years before she sought refugee status in the Netherlands in 1992. In her version of events, she had fled civil war in Somalia, was forced into an arranged marriage with a man whom she had never met and was not present at her own wedding. Upon escaping she was forced into hiding in the Netherlands, for her ex-husband and father's brothers would have been by Somali custom, required to perform an honor killing. According to witnesses on the programme, she left Somalia prior to any mass violence and led a comfortable, upper-middle class life in neighboring Kenya, where she attended a Muslim girls' school and received a full western-style education with a focus on the humanities and science.

Hirsi Ali had already admitted to friends and VVD party colleagues that she had lied about her full name, date of birth, and the manner in which she had come to the Netherlands in her asylum application, but persisted in saying it was true that she was trying to flee a forced marriage. In her first book, The Son Factory (2002), she had already provided her real name and date of birth, and she had also stated these in a September 2002 interview published in the political magazine HP/De Tijd. and in an interview in the VARA gids (2002). Hirsi Ali asserted in her 2006 autobiography Infidel that she had already made full disclosure of the discrepancy to VVD officials back when she was invited to run for parliament in 2002. On the issue of her name, she applied under her grandfather's surname in her asylum application ('Ali' instead of what had till then been 'Magan'), to which she was entitled nonetheless; she later said it was to escape detection and retaliation by her clan for the foiled marriage. In the later parliamentary investigation of Hirsi Ali's immigration, the Dutch law governing names was reviewed. An applicant may legally use a surname derived from any generation as far back as the grandparent. Therefore, Hirsi Ali's application, though against her clan custom of names, was legal under Dutch law. The question of her age was of minor concern. Media speculation arose in 2006 that she could lose her Dutch citizenship because of these issues, rendering her ineligible for parliament. At first, Minister Rita Verdonk said she would not look into the matter. She later decided to investigate Hirsi Ali's naturalisation process. The investigation found that Hirsi Ali had not legitimately received Dutch citizenship, because she had lied about her name and date of birth. However, later inquiries established that she was entitled to use the name Ali because it was her grandfather's name. Verdonk moved to annul Hirsi Ali's citizenship, an action later overridden at the urging of Parliament. (Note: The controversy over Hirsi Ali's citizenship followed a debate over the deportation of a Bosnian teenager Taida Pasić, who had lied on her visa application in order to return to the Netherlands to complete high school. According to her memoir, Hirsi Ali claims to have spoken up for Pasic in a private conversation with Verdonk and to have told the minister at the time that she had also lied in her own application. Verdonk denies this version of the conversation.)

On 15 May 2006, after the broadcast of the Zembla documentary, news stories appeared saying that Hirsi Ali was likely to move to the United States that September. She was reported to be planning to write a book titled Shortcut to Enlightenment and to work for the American Enterprise Institute. On 16 May Hirsi Ali resigned from Parliament after admitting that she had lied on her asylum application. In a press conference she said that the facts had been publicly known since 2002, when they had been reported in the media and in one of her publications. She also restated her claim of seeking asylum to prevent a forced marriage, stating: "How often do people who are seeking refuge provide different names? The penalty of stripping me of my Dutch citizenship is disproportional." Her stated reason for resigning immediately was the increasing media attention. Since a Dutch court had ruled in April 2006, that she had to leave her house by August 2006, she decided to relocate to the United States in September 2006.

After a long and emotional debate in the Dutch Parliament, all major parties supported a motion requesting the Minister to explore the possibility of special circumstances in Hirsi Ali's case. Although Verdonk remained convinced that the applicable law did not leave her room to consider such circumstances, she decided to accept the motion. During the debate, she said that Hirsi Ali still had Dutch citizenship during the period of reexamination. Apparently the "decision" she had announced had represented the current position of the Dutch government. Hirsi Ali at that point had six weeks to react to the report before any final decision about her citizenship was taken. Verdonk was strongly criticised for her actions in such a sensitive case. In addition to her Dutch passport, Hirsi Ali retained a Dutch residency permit based on being a political refugee. According to the minister, this permit could not be taken away from her since it had been granted more than 12 years before.

Reacting to news of Hirsi Ali's planned relocation to the US, former VVD leader Hans Wiegel stated that her departure "would not be a loss to the VVD and not be a loss to the House of Representatives". He said that Hirsi Ali was a brave woman, but that her opinions were polarizing. Former parliamentary leader of the VVD, Jozias van Aartsen, said that it is "painful for Dutch society and politics that she is leaving the House of Representatives". Another VVD MP, Bibi de Vries, said that if something were to happen to Hirsi Ali, some people in her party would have "blood on their hands". United States Deputy Secretary of State Robert Zoellick said in May 2006, "we recognise that she is a very courageous and impressive woman and she is welcome in the US."

In 2006, Hirsi Ali made available to The New York Times some letters she believed would provide insight into her 1992 asylum application. In one letter her sister Haweya warned her that the entire extended family was searching for her (after she had fled to the Netherlands), and in another letter her father denounced her. Christopher DeMuth, president of the American Enterprise Institute (AEI), said that the asylum controversy would not affect the appointment. He stated that he was still looking forward to "welcoming her to AEI, and to America."

On 27 June 2006, the Dutch government announced that Hirsi Ali would keep her Dutch citizenship. On the same day a letter was disclosed in which Hirsi Ali expressed regret for misinforming Minister Verdonk. Hirsi Ali was allowed to retain her name. Dutch immigration rules allowed asylum seekers to use grandparents' names. Her grandfather had used the last name Ali until his thirties and then switched to Magan, which was her father's and family's surname. This grandfather's birth year of 1845 had complicated the investigation. (Hirsi Ali's father Hirsi Magan Isse was the youngest of his many children and born when her grandfather was close to 90). Later the same day Hirsi Ali, through her lawyer and in television interviews, stated that she had signed the resignation letter, drafted by the Justice Department, under duress. She felt it was forced in order for her to keep her passport, but she had not wanted to complicate her pending visa application for the US. As of 2006 she still carried her Dutch passport.

In a special parliamentary session on 28 June 2006, questions were raised about these issues. The ensuing political upheaval on 29 June ultimately led to the fall of the second Balkenende cabinet.

== Life in the United States ==
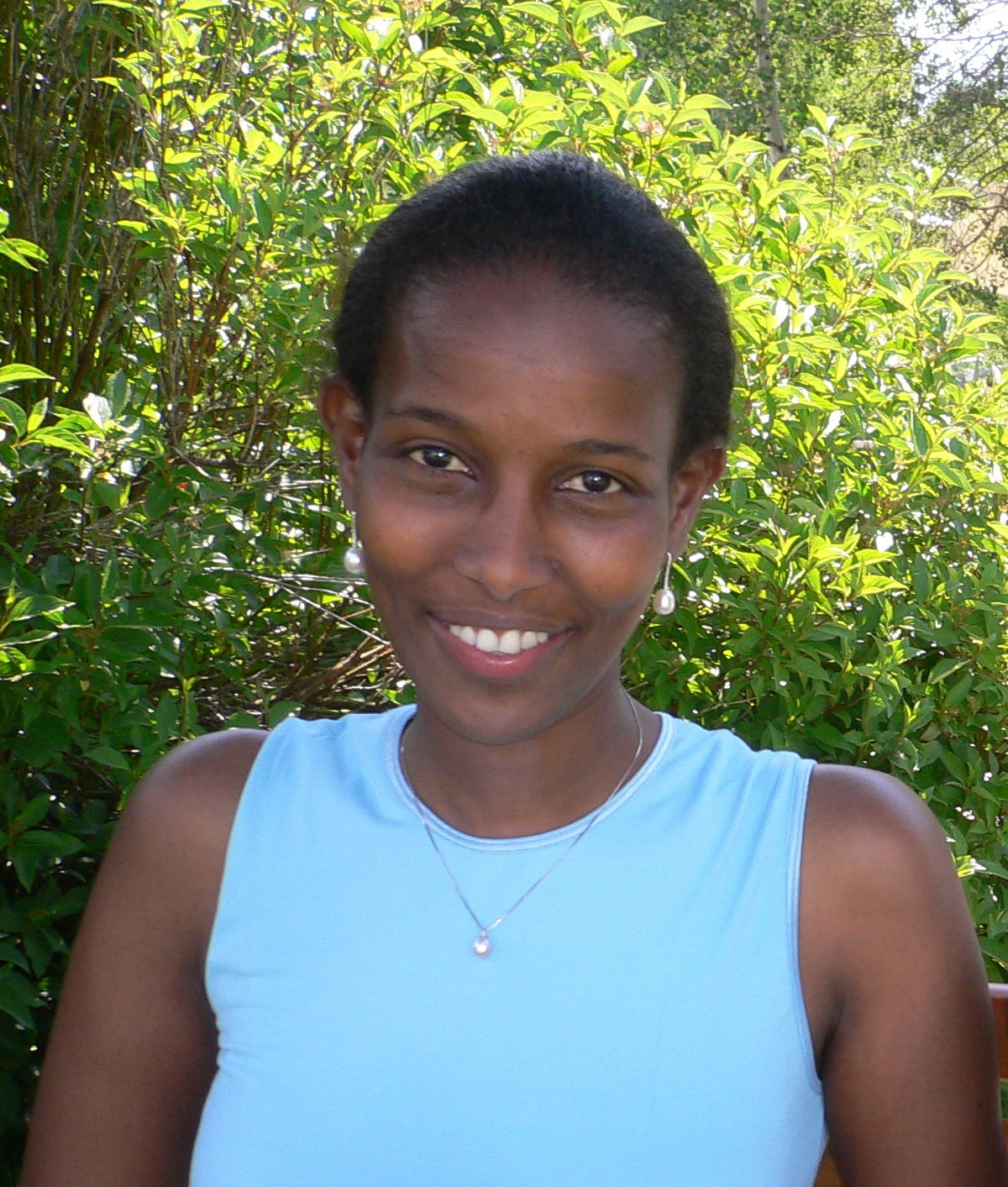
Hirsi Ali in 2006

In 2006, Hirsi Ali took a position at the American Enterprise Institute in Washington, D.C.; as the Dutch government continued to provide security for her, this required an increase in their effort and costs.

On 17 April 2007, the local Muslim community in Johnstown, Pennsylvania, protested Hirsi Ali's planned lecture at the local campus of the University of Pittsburgh. Pittsburgh imam Fouad El Bayly said that the activist deserved the death sentence but should be tried and judged in an Islamic country.

Hirsi Ali was granted permanent residency in the United States in 2007. In October 2007, she returned to the Netherlands, continuing her work for AEI from a secret address. The Dutch minister of Justice Hirsch Ballin had informed her of his ruling that, as of 1 October 2007, the Dutch government would no longer pay for her security abroad. That year she declined an offer to live in Denmark, saying she intended to return to the United States. She became a naturalized citizen of the United States in 2013.

She was a Fellow with the Future of Diplomacy Project at the Belfer Center for Science and International Affairs at The Harvard Kennedy School from 2016 to 2019.

=== Al-Qaeda hit list ===
In 2010, Anwar al-Awlaki published a hit list in his Inspire magazine, including Hirsi Ali, Geert Wilders, and Salman Rushdie along with cartoonists Lars Vilks and three Jyllands-Posten staff members: Kurt Westergaard, Carsten Juste, and Flemming Rose. The list was later expanded to include Stéphane "Charb" Charbonnier, who was murdered in 2015 in a terror attack on Charlie Hebdo in Paris, along with 11 other people. After the attack, Al-Qaeda called for more killings.

=== Brandeis University ===
In early 2014, Brandeis University, a private liberal-arts university in Massachusetts, announced that Hirsi Ali would receive an honorary degree. In April, the university rescinded the honor, expressing concern over Hirsi Ali's views on Islam. This occurred in response to protests by the Council on American–Islamic Relations (CAIR) and lobbying by Joseph E. B. Lumbard, Head of the Islamic Studies Department, other faculty members and several student groups that accused Hirsi Ali of hate speech. University president Frederick M. Lawrence said that "certain of her past statements" were inconsistent with the university's "core values" because they were "Islamophobic". The university said she was welcome to come to the campus for a dialogue in the future.

The university's withdrawal of its invitation generated controversy and condemnation among some. According to The Economist, Hirsi Ali's "wholesale condemnations of existing religions just aren't done in American politics." It said that "the explicit consensus in America is ecumenical and strongly pro-religious". The university was distinguishing between an open intellectual exchange, which could occur if Hirsi Ali came to campus for a dialogue and appearing to celebrate her with an honorary degree.

A Brandeis spokesperson said that Hirsi Ali had not been invited to speak at commencement but simply to be among honorary awardees. Hirsi Ali said CAIR's letter misrepresented her and her work, but that it has long been available on the Internet. She said that the "spirit of free expression" has been betrayed and stifled.

David Bernstein, a law professor at George Mason University, criticised the Brandeis decision as an attack on academic values of freedom of inquiry and intellectual independence.

=== Designation by Southern Poverty Law Center ===
In 2016, the Southern Poverty Law Center (SPLC) accused Hirsi Ali and Muslim activist Maajid Nawaz of being "anti-Muslim extremists". The Lantos Foundation for Human Rights & Justice wrote a public letter to the SPLC asking them to retract the listings. In 2018, the SPLC retracted the "Anti-Muslim Extremist" list in its entirety after Nawaz threatened legal action over his inclusion on the list.

=== Australia tour ===
In April 2017, she cancelled a planned tour of Australia. This followed the Facebook release of a video by six Australian Muslim women who accused her of being a "star of the global Islamophobia industry" and of profiting from "an industry that exists to dehumanize Muslim women" but did not call for her to cancel her trip. Hirsi Ali responded that the women in question were "carrying water" for the causes of radical Islamists and stated that "Islamophobia" is a manufactured word. She said that the cancellation was due to organisational problems.

== Social and political views ==
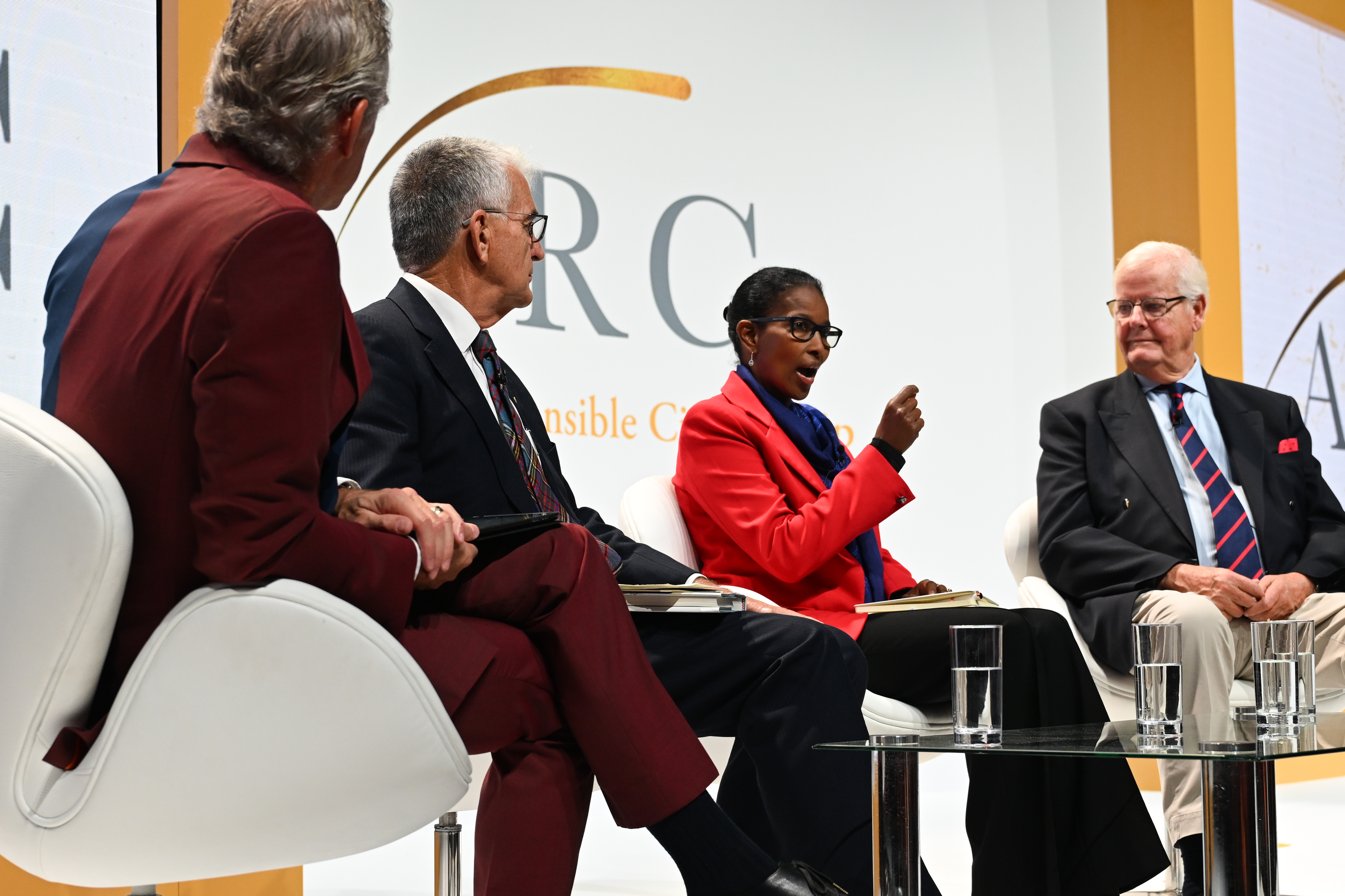
Hirsi Ali in a panel discussion with Jordan Peterson, John Anderson and Os Guinness at the Alliance for Responsible Citizenship Forum, London, 2023

Hirsi Ali joined the VVD political party in 2002; it combines "classically liberal" views on the economy, foreign policy, crime and immigration with a liberal social stance on abortion and homosexuality. She says that she admires Frits Bolkestein, a former Euro-commissioner and ideological leader of the party.

Hirsi Ali is the founder and president of the AHA Foundation, a non-profit humanitarian organisation to protect women and girls in the U.S. against political Islam and harmful tribal customs that violate U.S. law and international conventions. Through the AHA Foundation, Hirsi Ali campaigns against the denial of education for girls, female genital mutilation, forced marriage, honour violence and killings, and suppression of information about the crimes through the misuse and misinterpretation of rights to freedom of religion and free speech in the U.S. and the West.

Hirsi Ali has praised western liberalism. She was a participant in the first conference of the Alliance for Responsible Citizenship, speaking on the personal choice to support a narrative for western civilisation.

Hirsi Ali is an opponent of "Wokeism" and the Black Lives Matter movement, comparing them to ISIS, saying both reflected the "intolerant doctrines of a religious cult". In an interview with Douglas Murray on Piers Morgan Uncensored, she called Ibram X. Kendi a racist, adding, "A very loud minority wants to get ahead and is claiming they speak for all blacks and all women, all gender-identity minorities. They don't speak for any of these minorities. They do this so that they can get ahead. Ibram X. Kendi speaks for himself. Claudine Gay speaks for herself. She doesn't speak for me."

=== Islam and Muslims ===
Hirsi Ali is critical of Islam, including the treatment of women in Islamic societies and the punishments demanded by conservative Islamic scholars for homosexuality, blasphemy and adultery. She publicly identified as Muslim until 28 May 2002, when she acknowledged in her diary that she knew she was not.

She also explained in an interview that she began a serious reassessment of her religious beliefs after the 9/11 attacks and when she was drinking wine in an Italian restaurant, stating "I asked myself: Why should I burn in hell just because I'm drinking this? But what prompted me even more was the fact that the killers of 9/11 all believed in the same God I believed in."

In a 2007 interview in the London Evening Standard, Hirsi Ali characterised Islam as "the new fascism":

Just like Nazism started with Hitler's vision, the Islamic vision is a caliphate – a society ruled by Sharia law – in which women who have sex before marriage are stoned to death, homosexuals are beaten, and apostates like me are killed. Sharia law is as inimical to liberal democracy as Nazism ... Violence is inherent in Islam – it's a destructive, nihilistic cult of death. It legitimates murder.

In a 2007 article in Reason, Hirsi Ali said that Islam must be defeated and that "we are at war with Islam. And there's no middle ground in wars." She said, "Islam, period. Once it's defeated, it can mutate into something peaceful. It's very difficult to even talk about peace now. They're not interested in peace ... There comes a moment when you crush your enemy. ... and if you don't do that, then you have to live with the consequence of being crushed." Adding: "the Christian powers have accepted the separation of the worldly and the divine. We don't interfere with their religion, and they don't interfere with the state. That hasn't happened in Islam."

Max Rodenbeck, writing in The New York Review of Books, argued that Hirsi Ali is really criticising what she has, at points, called "Medina Muslims", meaning a minority of Islamic fundamentalists who envision a regime based on sharia, and who ignore the more inclusive passages of Muhammad's Meccan period. In a Congressional hearing, Hirsi Ali has argued this is because politics is built into the faith of Muslim people, saying:

"Islam is part religion, and part a political-military doctrine, the part that is a political doctrine contains a world view, a system of laws and a moral code that is totally incompatible with our constitution, our laws, and our way of life."

Although Hirsi Ali has previously described Islam as beyond reform, she has stated that the Arab Spring and growing visibility of women's rights activists within Muslim societies has demonstrated to her that a liberal reformation of Islam is possible, and outlines how this could be achieved in her book Heretic by supporting reformist Muslims.

She described Islamic societies as lagging "in enlightened thinking, tolerance and knowledge of other cultures" and that their history cannot cite a single person who "made a discovery in science or technology, or changed the world through artistic achievement".

In a 2010 interview with The Guardian, she claimed that when comparing the responses of Christians and Muslims to criticism of their respective religions, Christians often simply ignore criticism, while Muslims instead take offence, display a victim mentality and take criticism as insults.

She insists that many contemporary Muslims have not yet transitioned to modernity, and that many Muslim immigrants are culturally unsuited to life in the West and are therefore a burden. Hirsi Ali calls upon atheists, Christians, Europeans, and Americans to unite against Muslim extremism in the West. She urges the former to educate Muslims and the latter, especially Western Churches, to convert "as many Muslims as possible to Christianity, introducing them to a God who rejects Holy War and who has sent his son to die for all sinners out of love for mankind".

Speaking in April 2015 on an Australian Broadcasting Corporation radio program, Hirsi Ali said:

It's wrong for Western leaders like [former Prime Minister of Australia] Tony Abbott to say the actions of the Islamic State aren't about religion. I want to say to him 'please don't say such things in public because it's just not true.' You're letting down all the individuals who are reformers within Islam who are asking the right questions that will ultimately bring about change.

When discussing Muslims who become radicalized by Islamic State on the internet, Hirsi Ali argued that many of these people already adhered to fundamentalist Islamic ideas or came from families and communities that followed a literal practice of Islam before ISIS declared a caliphate, and that ISIS now gave them a focus to execute their beliefs. She commented that what the media has come to refer to as radical Islam or extremist individuals are in fact Muslims who become more pious in their beliefs and take both the Quran and examples set by the Islamic prophet Muhammad literally. She concluded that "people who have that mentality and that mindset are not a minority and they are not a fringe minority. Because of the large number of people who believe in this within Muslim communities and families who believe in this, definitely not all, but it is so large that these individuals who want to take action, who want to take it beyond believing and beyond practicing but actually want to kill people, they have a large enough group to hide in."

In a 2016 presentation for the American conservative platform PragerU, Hirsi Ali asserted that a reform of Islam was vital. She elaborated that while the majority of Muslims are peaceful, Islam as a belief-system in its current form cannot be considered a religion of peace as justification for violence against homosexuals, apostates and those deemed guilty of blasphemy are still clearly stated within Islamic scripture and that Western leaders need to stop downplaying the link between Islam and Islamic terrorism. She also added that Western progressives have often dismissed reformist and dissident Muslims as "not representative" and accused any criticism of Islam of being racist. She argued that instead, Western liberals should assist and ally themselves with Muslim reformists who put themselves at risk to push for change by drawing a parallel to when Russian dissidents who internally challenged the ideology of the Soviet Union during the Cold War were celebrated and assisted by people in the West.

In 2017, Hirsi Ali spoke of how Dawah is often a precursor to Islamism. In an article for The Sun she stated "in theory, dawa is a simple call to Islam. As Islamists practice the concept, however, it is a subversive, indoctrinating precursor to jihad. A process of methodical brainwashing that rejects assimilation and places Muslims in opposition to Western civic ideals. It is facilitated by funding from the Middle East, local charities and is carried out in mosques, Islamic centres, Muslim schools and even in people's living rooms. Its goal is to erode and ultimately destroy the political institutions of a free society and replace them with Sharia law."

==== Muhammad ====
Hirsi Ali criticises the central Islamic prophet on morality and personality traits (criticisms based on biographical details or depictions by Islamic texts and early followers of Muhammad). Muslims filed a religious discrimination suit against her that year. The civil court in the Hague acquitted Hirsi Ali of any charges, but said that she "could have made a better choice of words".

=== Female genital mutilation ===
Hirsi Ali is an opponent of female genital mutilation (FGM), which she has criticized in many of her writings. When in the Dutch parliament, she proposed obligatory annual medical checks for all girls living in the Netherlands who came from countries where it is practised. She proposed that if a physician found that such a girl had been mutilated, a report to the police would be required – with protection of the child prevailing over privacy. (Note: A similar mandatory reporting obligation was introduced in the UK in 2015 by amendments to the Female Genital Mutilation Act 2003.)

=== Atheism and conversion to Christianity ===
After formally renouncing Islam, Hirsi Ali identified as an atheist, saying she agreed with arguments put forward by Bertrand Russell, Christopher Hitchens and Richard Dawkins on organized religion. Alongside Dawkins, Hitchens, Daniel Dennett, and Sam Harris, collectively nicknamed the "Four Horsemen", Hirsi Ali is sometimes referred to as the fifth "Horseman" or "Horsewoman" of New Atheism.

In November 2023, Hirsi Ali converted to Christianity, stating that "atheism can't equip us for civilisational war." Explaining her decision in an essay for UnHerd, Hirsi Ali argued that the West was under threat from "the resurgence of great-power authoritarianism and expansionism in the forms of the Chinese Communist Party and Vladimir Putin's Russia; the rise of global Islamism, which threatens to mobilise a vast population against the West; and the viral spread of woke ideology, which is eating into the moral fibre of the next generation." Against such threats, secular approaches, whether they be arguments, technologies, or military force, are, in her view, inadequate. She concluded that upholding Judeo-Christian traditions was the most credible answer for the Western society to survive. The essay generated criticism both from Christians, who interpreted her conversion to Christianity as merely a cultural response and not a spiritual one, as well as from atheists who were "baffled" that she had not addressed what they considered materialist rebuttals of Christianity. In a discussion with Richard Dawkins, she mentioned that she believed in the resurrection, with Dawkins acknowledging that she was not just a political Christian.

Some commentators, such as Sarah Jones writing for New York magazine, suggested that for Hirsi Ali, "atheism only ever propped up her career as a culture warrior". Abandoning a New Atheist movement "in terminal decline" for a new vehicle, "she remains on the same crusade, inveighing against Islam and having simply exchanged one banner for another". On the other hand, columnist Ross Douthat in The New York Times assessed Hirsi Ali's decision to be the result of "a twofold realization": first, that atheistic materialism is too weak a base to build Western liberalism upon; and second, that while atheism had briefly provided "a sense of liberation from punitive religion", she found the long-term sense of life without spiritual solace to be "unendurable".

=== Feminism ===
Hirsi Ali has criticized Western feminists for avoiding the issue of the subjugation of women in the Muslim world and singled out Germaine Greer for arguing that FGM needs to be considered a "cultural identity" that Western women do not understand.

During the Brandeis University controversy, Hirsi Ali noted that "an authority on 'Queer/Feminist Narrative Theory' ... [sided] with the openly homophobic Islamists" in speaking against her.

Rich Lowry wrote in Politico that while Hirsi Ali had many traits that should have made her a "feminist hero", such as being a refugee from an abusive patriarchy and an African immigrant who made her way to a Western country and became an advocate for women's rights, this did not happen because she was "a dissident of the wrong religion". Some feminists instead criticise Hirsi Ali for "strengthening racism" instead of "weakening sexism".

=== Freedom of speech ===
In a 2006 lecture in Berlin, she defended the right to offend, following the Jyllands-Posten Muhammad cartoons controversy in Denmark. She condemned the journalists of those papers and TV channels that did not show their readers the cartoons as being "mediocre of mind". She also praised publishers all over Europe for showing the cartoons and not being afraid of what she called the "hard-line Islamist movement". In 2017, Hirsi Ali described the word Islamophobia as a "manufactured term" and argued "we can't stop the injustices if we say everything is Islamophobic and hide behind a politically correct screen."

=== Opposition to denominational or faith schools ===
In the Netherlands about half of all education has historically been provided by sponsored religious schools, most of them Christian, both Catholic and Protestant. As Muslims began to ask for support for schools, the state provided it and by 2005, there were 41 Islamic schools in the nation. This was based on the idea in the 1960s that Muslims could become one of the "pillars" of Dutch society, as were Protestants, Catholics and secular residents. Hirsi Ali has opposed state funding of any religious schools, including Islamic ones. In a 2007 interview with London-based Evening Standard, Hirsi Ali urged the British government to close all Muslim faith schools in the country and instead integrate Muslim pupils into mainstream society, arguing "Britain is sleepwalking into a society that could be ruled by Sharia law within decades unless Islamic schools are shut down and young Muslims are instead made to integrate and accept Western liberal values." In 2017, Hirsi Ali reasserted her belief that Islamic faith schools should be closed if they are found to be indoctrinating their students into political Islam and that such faith schools often exist in migrant dominated communities where students will have a lesser chance of integrating into mainstream society and that such cultural and educational "cocooning" breeds a lack of understanding or hostility towards the host culture. In 2020, Hirsi Ali stated that children in predominantly Muslim schools are less likely to be taught about the Holocaust and argued that schools should not cave into demands from Muslim parents that children should not be taught to remember the Holocaust in history lessons.

=== Development aid ===
The Netherlands has always been one of the most prominent countries that support aiding developing countries. As the spokesperson of the VVD in the parliament on this matter, Hirsi Ali said that the current aid policy had not achieved an increase in prosperity, peace and stability in developing countries: "The VVD believes that Dutch international aid has failed until now, as measured by [the Dutch aid effects on] poverty reduction, famine reduction, life expectancy and the promotion of peace."

=== Immigration ===
In 2003, Hirsi Ali worked together with fellow VVD MP Geert Wilders for several months. They questioned the government about immigration policy. In reaction to the UN Development Programme 2003 Arab Human Development Report, Hirsi Ali requested Minister of Foreign Affairs Jaap de Hoop Scheffer and the Minister without Portfolio for Development Cooperation Agnes van Ardenne to clarify government policy regarding the Arab world. Hirsi Ali and Wilders asked the government whether the report prompted changes in Dutch cooperation policy with the Arab world and in Dutch policy to reduce immigration from the Arab world to Europe, and in particular the Netherlands.

Although she publicly supported the policy of VVD minister Rita Verdonk to limit immigration, privately she was not supportive, as she explained in a June 2006 interview for Opzij. This interview was given after she resigned from Parliament, and shortly after she had moved to the United States.

In parliament, Hirsi Ali had supported the way Verdonk handled the Pasić case, although privately she felt that Pasić should have been allowed to stay. On the night before the debate, she phoned Verdonk to tell her that she had lied when she applied for asylum in the Netherlands, just as Pasić had. She said that Verdonk responded that if she had been minister at that time, she would have had Hirsi Ali deported.

In 2015, when Donald Trump suggested a complete ban on all Muslims entering the United States as part of his presidential campaign, Hirsi Ali responded by saying that such a pledge gave "false hope" to voters by questioning the reality of how such policy would be implemented and in practice it would offer a short-term solution to a long-term ideological issue. However, she also praised Trump's campaign messages for highlighting the problems posed by Islamic fundamentalism and said the outgoing Obama administration had "conspicuously avoided any discussion of Islamic theology, even avoiding use of the term radical Islam altogether."

In response to the Trump administration's Executive Order 13769 which imposed a travel ban on and temporarily restricted immigration and visa applications from several Muslim majority countries, Hirsi Ali described the ban as both "clumsy" but also "too narrow" for excluding nations such as Pakistan and Saudi Arabia who have been implicated in terrorism. However, she also stated agreement with Trump's assertion that some immigrants from Muslim nations are less likely to adapt to a Westernized lifestyle or are harder to screen as potential security risks, citing Ahmad Khan Rahami and Tashfeen Malik as examples of Muslims who entered the U.S. on immigration visas before committing acts of terrorism. She also maintained that as an immigrant herself, she was not opposed to Muslim immigrants coming to America seeking a better life but expressed concern over the attitudes that younger generations of Muslim-Americans bring with them and that society had a limited capacity to change those values. She has also defended the right for Western nations to screen all prospective Muslim immigrants to assess their beliefs and deport or deny residency to those who display sympathetic views to fundamentalism and violence.

In 2020, Hirsi Ali echoed statements made by French President Emmanuel Macron that Muslim immigrant communities, composed of both newly arrived migrants and second generation immigrants, had formed "separatist societies" in some European nations, and that there are "pockets of Europe" where Muslims have limited access to education or jobs and extremist Muslims "come in and take advantage of them." She also argued that many of the problems Europe faces in the twenty-first century with terrorism and parallel societies was born out of "racism of low expectations" in the past, in which European governments did not expect immigrants from Middle Eastern or African backgrounds to become Europeanized or have the capability to contribute positively, but instead out of misguided compassion, multicultural sentiments and political correctness, encouraged immigrants to keep their native cultures or caved into demands from religiously conservative immigrant communities who rejected European culture.

Hirsi Ali discussed her view on immigration in Europe, in an op-ed article published in the Los Angeles Times in 2006.

Regarding unemployment, social marginalization and poverty among certain immigrant communities, Hirsi Ali places the burden of responsibility squarely on Islam and migrant culture.

In 2010, she opposed the idea of preventing immigrants from traditional Muslim societies from immigrating, claiming that allowing them to immigrate made the U.S. a "highly moral country".

=== Assimilation ===
"When I speak of assimilation", Hirsi Ali says, "I mean assimilation into civilization. Aboriginals, Afghanis, Somalis, Arabs, Native Americans – all these non-Western groups have to make that transition to modernity". Sadiya Abubakar Isa criticized these comments in an article for the Indonesian Journal of Islam and Muslim Societies, accusing her of Orientalism.

=== Israel and the Palestinians ===
On the way Israel is perceived in the Netherlands, she has said:

The crisis of Dutch socialism can be sized up in its attitudes toward both Islam and Israel. It holds Israel to exceptionally high moral standards. The Israelis, however, will always do well, because they themselves set high standards for their actions. The standards for judging the Palestinians, however, are very low. Most outsiders remain silent on all the problems in their territories. That helps the Palestinians become even more corrupt than they already are. Those who live in the territories are not allowed to say anything about this because they risk being murdered by their own people.

== Personal life ==
Hirsi Ali married British–American historian Niall Ferguson on 10 September 2011. They have two sons.

In 2023, Hirsi Ali announced that she had become a Christian.

== Reception ==
Patt Morrison of the Los Angeles Times called Hirsi Ali a freedom fighter for feminism who has "put her life on the line to defend women against radical Islam." Jill Filipovic of The New York Times writes that "There are few women in the world who generate as much animosity, and as many accusations of hypocrisy, as Ayaan Hirsi Ali."

Tunku Varadarajan wrote in 2017 that, with "multiple fatwas on her head, Hirsi Ali has a greater chance of meeting a violent end than anyone I've met, Salman Rushdie included." According to Andrew Anthony of The Guardian, Hirsi Ali is admired by many secularists and "loathed not just by Islamic fundamentalists but by many western liberals, who find her rejection of Islam almost as objectionable as her embrace of western liberalism."

According to Rula Jebreal, a Palestinian journalist and foreign policy analyst, Hirsi Ali's criticism applies mostly to "Wahhabism", the strain of Islam most familiar to Hirsi Ali, and not to Islam as a whole. Jebreal added that Hirsi Ali's "outbursts" originated from her own pain, "physical scars inflicted on her body during childhood", which were justified by a radical version of the religion into which she was born. Jebreal wrote: "To endorse Hirsi Ali so unabashedly is to insult and mock a billion Muslims. It's time to listen to what is being said by the Muslim voices of peace and tolerance. Ayaan Hirsi Ali is not one of them."

== Publications ==
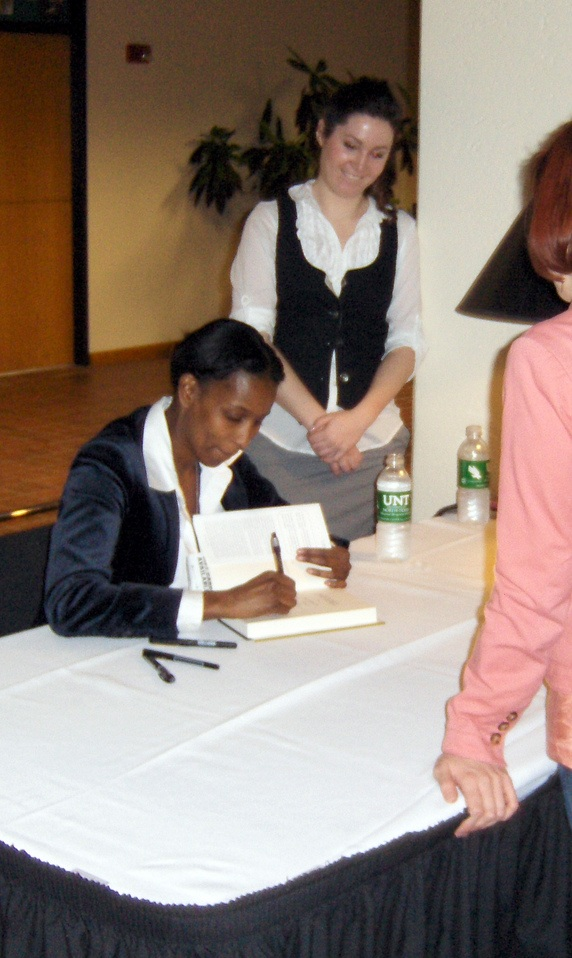
Hirsi Ali at a book signing in 2008

Hirsi Ali has authored two memoirs. In her first work, she said that in 1992 her father arranged to marry her to a distant cousin. She says that she objected to this both on general grounds (she has said she dreaded being forced to submit to a stranger, sexually and socially), and specifically to this man, whom she described as a "bigot" and an "idiot" in her book.

She told her family that she planned to join her husband, who was living in Canada, after obtaining a visa while in Germany. However, in her autobiography, she said she spent her time in Germany trying to devise an escape from her unwanted marriage. Hirsi Ali decided to visit a relative in the Netherlands, and to seek help after arrival and claim asylum.

Her first memoir, published in the Netherlands as Mijn Vrijheid ('My Freedom') in 2006, was published in English as Infidel: My Life, becoming a New York Times best seller in 2007. In a review, American Enterprise Institute fellow Joshua Muravchik described the book as "simply a great work of literature", comparing Hirsi Ali to novelist Joseph Conrad.

In her second memoir, Nomad: From Islam to America (2010), Hirsi Ali further explored her life since renouncing Islam and being excluded from Dutch politics. In the book, she wrote that in early 2006, Rita Verdonk had personally approached her to ask for her public support in Verdonk's campaign to run for party leader of the VVD. Hirsi Ali wrote that she had personally supported Verdonk's opponent, Mark Rutte, as the better choice. She says that after telling Verdonk of her position, the minister became vindictive. Hirsi Ali wrote that, after the 2006 report of the Zembla TV program, Verdonk campaigned against Hirsi Ali in retaliation for her earlier lack of support.

Her latest book was released in February 2021 and is titled Prey: Immigration, Islam, and the Erosion of Women's Rights.

=== The Caged Virgin ===
In his 2006 review of this collection of seventeen essays and articles on Islam by Hirsi Ali, journalist Christopher Hitchens noted her three themes: "first, her own gradual emancipation from tribalism and superstition; second, her work as a parliamentarian to call attention to the crimes being committed every day by Islamist thugs in mainland Europe; and third, the dismal silence, or worse, from many feminists and multiculturalists about this state of affairs."

He described the activist as a "charismatic figure in Dutch politics" and criticised the Dutch government for how it protected her from Islamic threats after her collaboration with Theo van Gogh on the short film Submission and the assassination of the director.

Saba Mahmood noted that the title of the work is "highly reminiscent of the nineteenth-century literary genre centered on Orientalist fantasies of the harem".

=== Infidel: My Life (2007 in English) ===
The Guardian summarised Infidel thus: "[Hirsi Ali]'s is a story of exile from her clan through war, famine, arranged marriage, religious apostasy and the shocking murder on the streets of Amsterdam of her collaborator, Theo van Gogh. Told with lyricism, wit, huge sorrow and a great heart, this is one of the most amazing adventure narratives of the age of mass migration."

William Grimes wrote in The New York Times: "The circuitous, violence-filled path that led Ms. Hirsi Ali from Somalia to the Netherlands is the subject of 'Infidel,' her brave, inspiring and beautifully written memoir. Narrated in clear, vigorous prose, it traces the author's geographical journey from Mogadishu to Saudi Arabia, Ethiopia and Kenya, and her desperate flight to the Netherlands to escape an arranged marriage."

In his critique of the book, Christopher Hitchens noted that two leading leftist intellectual commentators, Timothy Garton Ash and Ian Buruma, described Hirsi Ali as an "Enlightenment fundamentalist". Hitchens noted further that, far from being a "fundamentalist", Hirsi escaped from a "society where women are subordinate, censorship is pervasive, and violence is officially preached against unbelievers."

=== Nomad: From Islam to America ===
The Guardian observed that Nomad describes "a clan system shattering on the shores of modernity". The books expands Hirsi Ali's previous early life descriptions focusing on "the remarkable figure of her grandmother, who gave birth to daughters alone in the desert and cut her own umbilical cord, raged at herself for producing too many girls, rebelled against her husband, arranged for the circumcision of her granddaughters and instilled in them an unforgiving, woman-hating religion." According to the newspaper's review, "Hirsi Ali observes that her own nomadic journey has been taken across borders that have been mental as much as geographical. In Nomad she calls her ancestral voices into direct confrontation with her demands for reform of Islamic theology. The result is electrifying."

Hirsi Ali called Nomad her most provocative book for urging moderate Muslims to become Christians. She later backed off from this view. After witnessing the Arab Spring, Hirsi Ali also took back her argument in Nomad that Islam is beyond reform.

=== Heretic: Why Islam Needs a Reformation Now ===
We delude ourselves that our deadliest foes are somehow not actuated by the ideology they openly affirm.

— Ayaan Hirsi Ali

In the book Hirsi Ali quoted statistics such as that 75% of Pakistanis favour the death penalty for apostasy and argue that Sharia law is gaining ground in many Muslim-majority nations. Hirsi Ali quotes verses in the Qur'an encouraging followers to use violence and makes the argument that as long as the Qur'an is perceived to be the literal divine words, violent extremists have a justification for their acts.

Andrew Anthony for The Guardian in 2015 wrote that even her fiercest critics would have problems denying what Hirsi Ali writes about current issues in Islam, and since those issues are unpalatable, an added difficulty is a cultural practice to "not offend anyone." Anthony concluded that regardless of what critics may think of her solution, Hirsi Ali should be commended for her "unblinking determination to address the problem."

Susan Dominus of The New York Times wrote: "In Heretic, Hirsi Ali forgoes autobiography for the most part in favor of an extended argument. But she has trouble making anyone else's religious history – even that of Muhammad himself, whose life story she recounts – as dramatic as she has made her own. And she loses the reader's trust with overblown rhetoric. ... She tries to warn Americans about their naïveté in the face of encroaching Islamic influences, maintaining that officials and journalists, out of cultural sensitivity, sometimes play down the honor killings that occur in the West."

According to The Economist: "Unfortunately, very few Muslims will accept Ms Hirsi Ali's full-blown argument, which insists that Islam must change in at least five important ways. A moderate Muslim might be open to discussion of four of her suggestions if the question were framed sensitively. Muslims, she says, must stop prioritizing the afterlife over this life; they must 'shackle sharia' and respect secular law; they must abandon the idea of telling others, including non-Muslims, how to behave, dress or drink; and they must abandon holy war. However, her biggest proposal is a show-stopper: she wants her old co-religionists to 'ensure that Muhammad and the Koran are open to interpretation and criticism.'"

=== Books ===
- De zoontjesfabriek. Over vrouwen, islam en integratie, translated as The Son Factory: About Women, Islam and Integration. A collection of essays and lectures from before 2002. It also contains an extended interview originally published in Opzij, a feminist magazine. The book focuses on the position of Muslims in the Netherlands.
- De Maagdenkooi (2004), translated in 2006 as The Caged Virgin: A Muslim Woman's Cry for Reason a.k.a. The Caged Virgin: An Emancipation Proclamation for Women and Islam. A collection of essays and lectures from 2003 to 2004, combined with her personal experiences as a translator working for the NMS. The book focuses on the position of women in Islam.
- Infidel: My Life. An autobiography originally published in Dutch as Mijn Vrijheid in September 2006 by Augustus, Amsterdam and Antwerp, 447 pages, ISBN 978-90-457-0112-7; and in English in February 2007. It was edited by Richard Miniter.
- Nomad: From Islam to America: A Personal Journey Through the Clash of Civilizations. Her second autobiography, published by Free Press in 2010. ISBN 978-1-4391-5731-2
- Heretic: Why Islam Needs a Reformation Now, published by Harper in March 2015; Hirsi Ali makes a case that a religious reformation is the only way to end the terrorism, sectarian warfare, and repression of women and minorities that each year claim thousands of lives throughout the Muslim world. ISBN 978-0-06-233393-3
- Prey: Immigration, Islam, and the Erosion of Women's Rights, published by Harper (July 2021). Hirsi Ali discusses the migration from Muslim-majority countries to Europe which peaked during the European migrant crisis and argues that this coincided with rising levels of sexual violence towards women in the receiving countries. She also argues that governments, law enforcement and feminists appear eager to suppress attention towards illegal immigration. ISBN 978-0-06-285787-3

== Awards ==
- 2004, she was awarded the Prize of Liberty by the Flemish classical liberal think tank Nova Civitas.
- 2004, she was awarded the Freedom Prize of Denmark's Liberal Party, the country's largest party, "for her work to further freedom of speech and the rights of women".

In the year following the assassination of her collaborator, Theo van Gogh, Hirsi Ali received five awards related to her activism.

- 2005, she was awarded the Harriet Freezerring Emancipation Prize by Cisca Dresselhuys, editor of the feminist magazine Opzij.
- 2005, she was awarded the annual European Bellwether Prize by the Norwegian think tank Human Rights Service. According to HRS, Hirsi Ali is "beyond a doubt, the leading European politician in the field of integration. (She is) a master at the art of mediating the most difficult issues with insurmountable courage, wisdom, reflectiveness, and clarity".
- 2005, she was awarded the annual Democracy Prize of the Swedish Liberal People's Party "for her courageous work for democracy, human rights and women's rights."
- 2005, she was ranked by American Time magazine amongst the 100 Most Influential Persons of the World, in the category of "Leaders & Revolutionaries".
- 2005, she was awarded the Tolerance Prize of Madrid.
- She was voted European of the Year for 2006 by the European editors of Reader's Digest magazine.
- 2006, she was given the civilian prize Glas der Vernunft in Kassel, Germany. The organisation rewarded her with this prize for her courage in criticising Islam (1 October 2006). Other laureates have included Leah Rabin, the wife of former Israeli prime-minister Yitzhak Rabin, and Hans-Dietrich Genscher, former Foreign Minister of the Federal Republic of Germany.
- 2006, she received the Moral Courage Award from the American Jewish Committee.
- 2007, she was given the annual Goldwater Award for 2007 from the Goldwater Institute in Phoenix, Arizona.
- 2008, she was awarded the Simone de Beauvoir Prize, an international human rights prize for women's freedom, which she shared with Taslima Nasreen.
- 2008, she was given the Anisfield-Wolf Book Award for nonfiction for her autobiography Infidel (2007 in English). The Anisfield-Wolf awards recognise "recent books that have made important contributions to our understanding of racism and appreciation of the rich diversity of human culture."
- 2010, she was awarded the Emperor Has No Clothes Award by the Freedom From Religion Foundation.
- 2016, she was awarded the Philip Merrill Award for Outstanding Contributions to Liberal Arts Education
- 2017, she was awarded the Oxi Day Courage Award by the Washington Oxi Day Foundation

== See also ==
- Yasmine Mohammed
- Maryam Namazie
- Mona Walter
