= Submission (2004 film) =

2004 Dutch short drama film

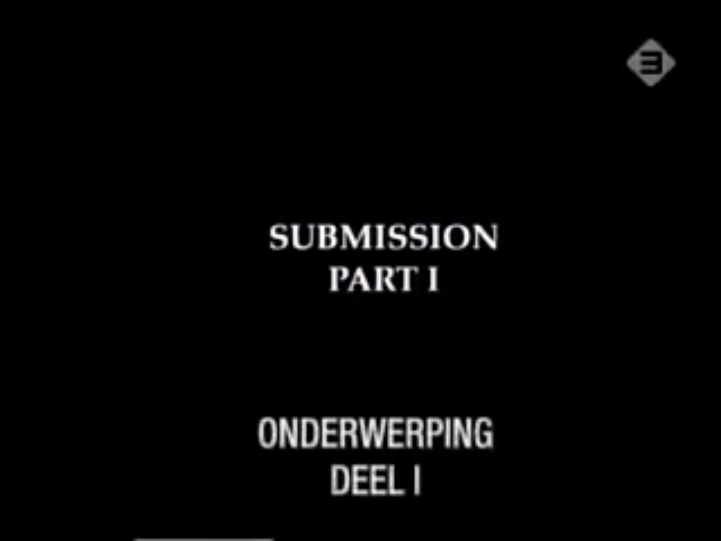
- Titlecard, with Dutch subtitles
- Directed by: Theo van Gogh
- Written by: Ayaan Hirsi Ali
- Produced by: Theo van Gogh; Gijs van de Westelaken
- Cinematography: Theo van Gogh
- Edited by: Theo van Gogh
- Music by: Theo van Gogh
- Release date: 29 August 2004
- Running time: 10 minutes
- Country: Netherlands
- Language: English
- Budget: €18,000

Submission is a 2004 English-language Dutch short drama film produced and directed by Theo van Gogh, and written by Ayaan Hirsi Ali, a former member of the Dutch House of Representatives for the People's Party for Freedom and Democracy. It was shown in Zomergasten on VPRO, a Dutch television show, on 29 August 2004. The film's title is one of the possible translations of the Arabic word "Islam".

An Islamist, Mohammed Bouyeri, reacted to the film by assassinating Van Gogh. His death led to widespread condemnation and protests across the Netherlands.

== Content ==
The film tells the story of four fictional characters played by a single actress wearing a veil, but clad in a see-through Hijab, her naked body painted with verses from the Quran. The characters are Muslim women who have been abused in various ways. The film contains monologues of these women and dramatically highlights three verses of the Quran (4:34, 2:222 and 24:2), by showing them painted on women's bodies.

== Motivation ==
Image of a woman's body with Koranic verses written on it from the film Submission. The actress plays the role of a Muslim woman (dressed with a transparent black clothing), having been beaten and raped by a relative. The bodies are used in the film as a canvas for verses from the Quran.

Writer Hirsi Ali has said "it is written in the Quran a woman may be slapped if she is disobedient. This is one of the evils I wish to point out in the film". In an answer to a question about whether the film would offend Muslims, Hirsi Ali said that "if you're a Muslim woman and you read the Quran, and you read in there that you should be raped if you say 'no' to your husband, that is offensive. And that is insulting."

Director Theo Van Gogh, who was known as a controversial and provocative personality, called the film a "political pamphlet."

== Reception ==
The film drew praise for portraying the ways in which women are abused in accordance with fundamentalist Islamic law, as well as anger for criticising Islamic canon itself. It drew the following comment from movie critic Phill Hall, "Submission was bold in openly questioning misogyny and a culture of violence against women because of Koranic interpretations. The questions raised in the film deserve to be asked: is it divine will to assault or kill women? Is there holiness in holding women at substandard levels, denying them the right to free will and independent thought? And ultimately, how can such a mindframe exist in the 21st century?" Film critic Dennis Lim, on the other hand, stated that, "It's depressing to think that this morsel of glib effrontery could pass as a serious critique of conservative Islam." Another (unnamed) critic referred to the stories told in the film as "simplistic, even caricatures".

After the film's broadcast on Dutch television, newspaper De Volkskrant reported claims of plagiarism against Hirsi Ali and Van Gogh, made by Internet journalist Francisco van Jole. Van Jole said the duo had "aped" the ideas of Iranian-American video artist Shirin Neshat. Neshat's work, which made abundant use of Persian calligraphy projected onto bodies, had been shown in the Netherlands in 1997 and 2000.

== Murder of Theo van Gogh ==
On 2 November 2004, Van Gogh was assassinated in public by Mohammed Bouyeri, a Dutch-Moroccan Muslim with a Dutch passport. A letter, stabbed through and affixed to the body by a dagger, linked the murder to Van Gogh's film and his views regarding Islam. It was addressed to Ayaan Hirsi Ali and called for a jihad against kafir (unbelievers or infidels), against America, Europe, the Netherlands, and Hirsi Ali herself. Following the murder of Van Gogh, tens of thousands gathered in the center of Amsterdam to mourn Van Gogh's death. Besides Bouyeri, eleven other Muslim men were arrested and charged with conspiracy to assassinate Hirsi Ali. Bouyeri was jailed for life, for which in the Netherlands there is no possibility of parole, and pardons are rarely granted. Some of the others were convicted of other offences in relation to their involvement in the so-called Hofstad Network, but not for a direct connection with the Van Gogh murder.

== See also ==
- Apostasy in Islam
- Criticism of Islam
- Criticism of the Quran

Women in Muslim societies

- Islam and domestic violence
- Namus
- Women in Islam

Other controversies

- Jyllands-Posten Muhammad cartoons controversy – following publication of cartoons in a Danish newspaper in 2005
- Lars Vilks Muhammad drawings controversy – beginning in 2007
- Fitna – 2008 Dutch short film critical of Islam
- Charlie Hebdo shooting – 2015 murders in Paris following publication of cartoons
