= BETASOM =

Italian submarine base in Bordeaux, France

- Bordeaux Sommergibili
- Bordeaux, France
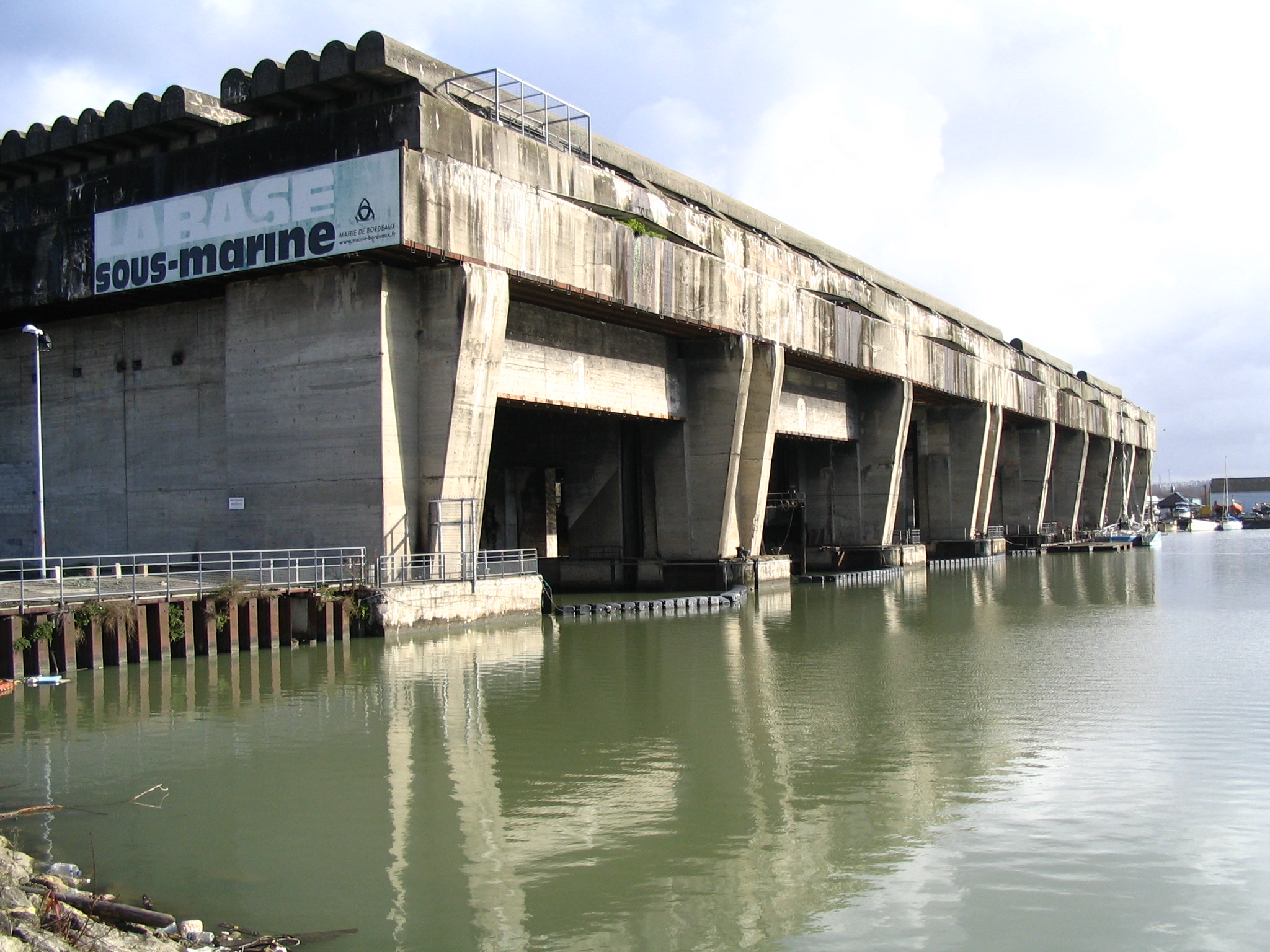

Site information
- Type: Submarine base
- Controlled by: Kingdom of Italy

Location
- France
- Location within France
- Coordinates: 44.867534°N 0.559341°W

Site history
- In use: August 1940 – September 1943
- Battles/wars: Battle of the Atlantic

Garrison information
- Past commanders: Angelo Parona (August 1940 – September 1941); Romolo Polacchini (September 1941 – December 1942); Enzo Grossi (December 1942 – September 1943)
- Garrison: 1,600
- Occupants: Regia Marina

BETASOM (an acronym of Bordeaux Sommergibile or Sommergibili) was a submarine base established at Bordeaux in France by the Regia Marina during the Second World War. (Note: "B" (for Bordeaux) is rendered with BETA and SOM is an abbreviation for sommergibile (plural sommergibili) that is,with sottomarino, Italian for submarine.) Italian submarines used the base during the Battle of the Atlantic from 1940 to 1943 as part of the Axis anti-shipping campaign against the Allies.

== Establishment ==
Axis naval co-operation started after the signing of the Pact of Steel in June 1939 with meetings in Friedrichshafen, Germany, and an agreement to exchange technical information. After the Italian entry into the war and the Fall of France, the Italian Royal Navy established a submarine base at Bordeaux, which was within the German occupation zone. The Italians were allocated a sector of the Atlantic south of Lisbon to patrol. The base was opened in August 1940 and in 1941 the captured French passenger ship De Grasse was used as a depot ship before being returned to the Vichy Government in June 1942.

Admiral Angelo Parona commanded the submarines at BETASOM under the operational control of Konteradmiral (Rear Admiral) Karl Dönitz. Dönitz was the "Commander of the Submarines" (Befehlshaber der U-Boote) for the German Kriegsmarine. About 1,600 men were based at BETASOM. A postal system was operated, using a distinctive stamp cancellation and overprinted Italian stamps. These are generally rare and have been counterfeited.

The base could house up to thirty submarines, it had dry docks and two basins connected by locks. Shore barracks accommodated a security guard of 250 men of the San Marco Regiment. A second base was established at La Pallice in La Rochelle, France. This second base allowed submerged training which was not possible at Bordeaux.

== Operational detail ==
From June 1940, three Italian submarines patrolled off the Canary Islands and Madeira, followed by three more off the Azores. When these patrols were completed, the six boats returned to their new base at Bordeaux. Their initial patrol area was the Northwestern Approaches. Dönitz was pragmatic about the Italians, seeing them as inexperienced, but useful for reconnaissance and likely to gain expertise.

In November 1940 there were 26 Italian boats at Bordeaux. Initially, their activity did not meet much success; unacquainted with Atlantic weather conditions, Italian submarines sighted convoys but lost contact and failed to make effective reports. As co-operation between the two navies was not working well, Dönitz decided to reassign the Italian boats to the southern area where they could act independently. In this way, about thirty Italian boats achieved more success, though without much impact on the most critical areas of the campaign.

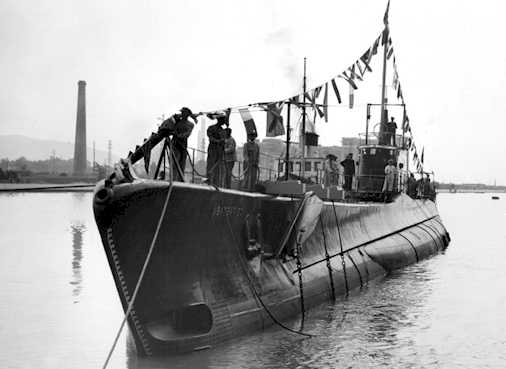
Italian submarine Barbarigo

Dönitz considered the Italians as displaying "great dash and daring in battle, often exceeding that of Germans", but less toughness, endurance and tenacity. By 30 November 1940, Italian submarines in the Atlantic each sank an average of 200 gross tons per day, while German U-boats each averaged 1,115 gross tons per day during the same period. Italian submarines, had only been in the Atlantic for a few months and had not had yet the time to adapt to the new operational conditions, whereas the U-boats had been operating there for more than a year.

To improve the performance of the Italian submarines, several measures were taken, following the Kriegsmarine, older Italian submarine commanders (some were 40 years old) were replaced with younger officers, who possessed more aggression and stamina; a "submarine school" was created in Gotenhafen, where commanders, officers and bridge crews of the BETASOM submarines were trained according to the German model (the submarine Reginaldo Giuliani was assigned to this task, in cooperation with German naval units). Italian submarines also underwent improvement work, such as the reshaping of their excessively large conning towers.

Map of the North Atlantic Ocean

These measures significantly improved the performance of the remaining Italian submarines (in 1941, about half were recalled to the Mediterranean following the submarine losses there); the average tonnage sunk by BETASOM submarines rose from 3,844 gross register tons (GRT) in 1940 to 27,335 GRT in 1942 (and, respectively, from 7,779 GRT to 68,337 GRT per submarine). The tonnage sunk for every lost submarine was 32,672 GRT in 1940 (opposed to 188,423 GRT for German submarines), 20,432 GRT in 1941 (70,871 GRT for Germans submarines), 136,674 GRT in 1942 (68,801 GRT for German submarines) and 13,498 GRT in 1943 (11,391 GRT for German submarines).

Between February and March 1942, five BETASOM submarines (along with six German U-boats) took part in Operation Neuland, sinking 15 of the 45 Allied merchant ships destroyed during this operation. The top scoring BETASOM aces, Gianfranco Gazzana-Priaroggia (90,601 GRT sunk) and Carlo Fecia di Cossato (96,553 GRT sunk), were among the few Italian recipients of the Knight's Cross of the Iron Cross. Gazzana-Priaroggia's boat, Leonardo da Vinci, was the top-scoring non-German submarine of World War II, with 17 ships sunk totalling 120,243 GRT. (Note: The US Navy's most successful submarine, USS Tang, sank 116,454 GRT, while HMS Upholder, the Royal Navy's most successful submarine, sank 93,031 GRT of shipping.) Another notable Betasom commander was Salvatore Todaro, known for his habit of towing to safety the lifeboats containing the survivors of ships he had sunk.

The Italian naval historian Giorgio Giorgerini writes that Italian submarines did not perform as well as the U-boats but achieved good results considering the deficiencies of their boats (among which were the lack of modern torpedo fire-control systems, and their slower speed surfaced and submerged). Comparing the tonnages sunk by U-boats to the Italian submarines and their losses (16 Italian submarines lost against 247 U-boats), the "exchange rates" (gross tonnage sunk divided by the number of submarines lost) were respectively 40,591 t for the German units and 34,512 t for the Italian ones. The strategic significance of Italy's participation in the Battle of the Atlantic was small, as the number of Italian submarines that operated in the Atlantic was 30 at its peak, whereas the Kriegsmarine committed over 1,000 submarines to the Battle of the Atlantic between 1939 and 1945. Italian submarines operating in the Atlantic sank 109 Allied merchant ships totalling 601,425 tons, and lost 16 boats.

== German U-boat activities ==
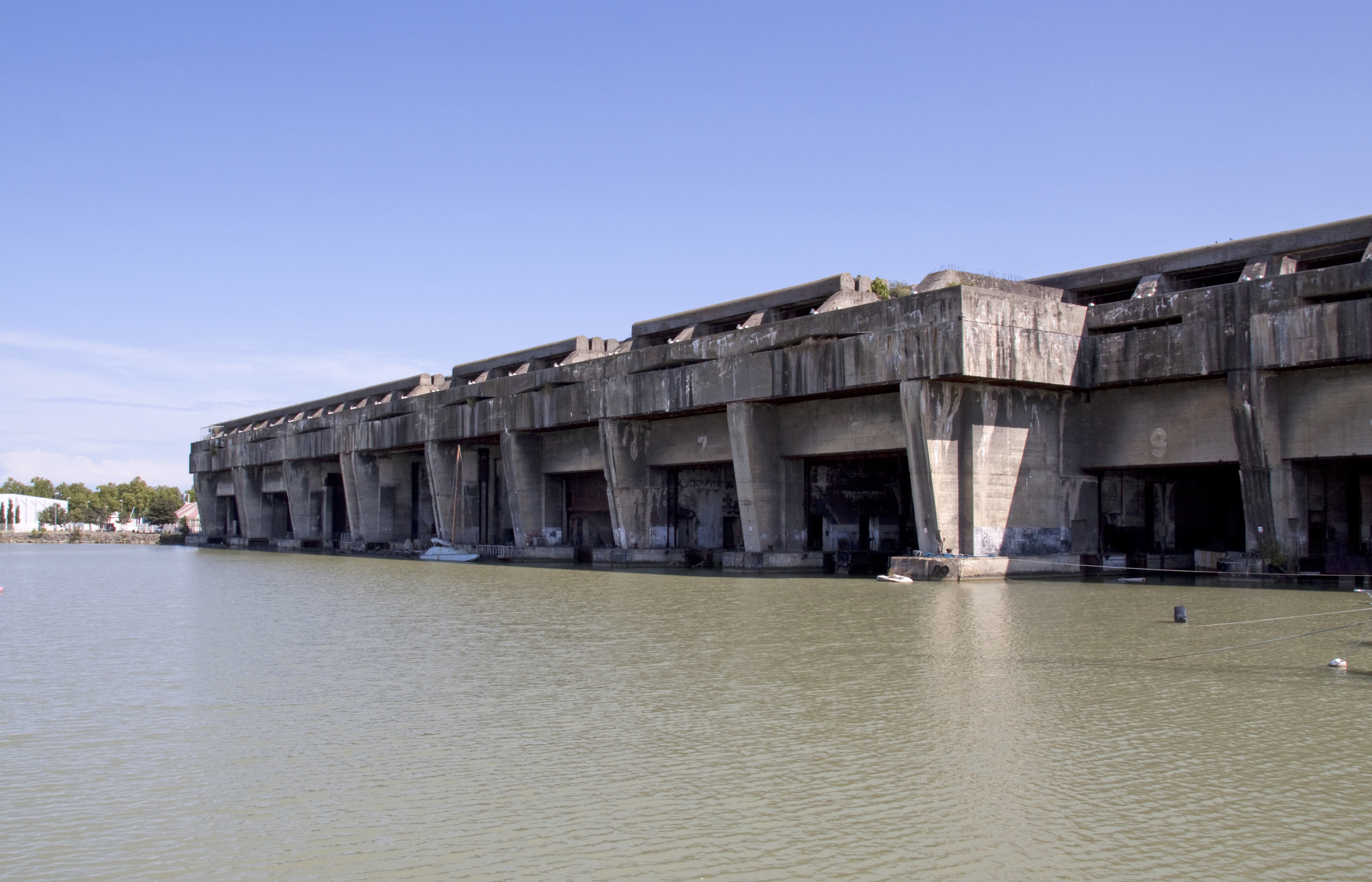
Remains of U-boat pens in Bordeaux (2009)

Dönitz decided in mid-1941 to build reinforced concrete protective U-boat pens in Bordeaux. Construction began in September 1941, 245 m (804 ft) wide, 162 m (531 ft) deep, and 19 m (62 ft) high, with a roof above the pens 5.6 m (18 ft 4 in) thick and 3.6 m (11 ft 10 in) thick above the rear servicing area. On 15 October 1942, the 12th U-boat Flotilla (Korvettenkapitän Klaus Scholtz) was formed at Bordeaux by the Kriegsmarine. The first U-boat to use the bunker was U-178 on 17 January 1943.

== End of operations ==
The base was bombed by the British on several occasions, especially in 1940 and 1941 but no significant damage was suffered, except for the sinking of the barracks ship Usaramo. The base was affected by Operation Josephine B in June 1941, a sabotage raid that destroyed the electricity substation that served the base. The remaining BETASOM boats ended their last offensive patrol in 1943, after which Bagnolini, Barbarigo, Comandante Cappellini, Finzi, Giuliani, Tazzoli and Torelli were adapted to carry supplies from the Far East as part of an agreement between Italy and Germany, in exchange for the transfer of an equal number of Type VIIC U-boats, which would be manned by Italian crews and continue Italian participation in submarine operations in the Atlantic.

Of the transport submarines, two were sunk by the Allies, three were captured in the Far East by the Japanese after the Armistice of Cassibile, the Italian surrender of September 1943 and ceded to the Germans and two were captured in Bordeaux by the Germans. The U-Boats ceded to Italy were still training in Danzig with their new Italian crews when the armistice was announced and were immediately retaken by the Kriegsmarine. Ammiraglio Cagni, the newest Betasom submarine and the only one still on patrol at the time of the armistice, broke off her patrol and reached Durban in South Africa in compliance with the armistice orders. After the Armistice the base was seized by the Germans. Some of the Italian personnel joined the Germans independently of the Italian Social Republic. During this period the Italian postage stamps on hand were overprinted to show loyalty to Mussolini's rump state. The last two U-boats left Bordeaux in August 1944 and the Allies occupied the base on 25 August. The German naval personnel attempted to march back to Germany but were captured by US forces on 11 September 1944.

== BETASOM submarines ==
In 1940, all twenty-eight Italian submarines which were to be based at BETASOM initially had to sail from bases on the Mediterranean Sea through the Straits of Gibraltar to reach the Atlantic Ocean; all succeeded.

Italian submarines at BETASOM
Name	Arrival	Patrol	Ships sunk	GRT	Notes
Alessandro Malaspina	4 September 1940	6	3	16,384	Lost, all hands, September 1941
Barbarigo	8 September 1940	11	7	39,300	Converted transport boat, lost, all hands June 1943
Dandolo	10 September 1940	6	2	6,554	Returned Mediterranean, June–July 1941
Guglielmo Marconi	29 September 1940	6	7	19,887	Lost, all hands, September 1941
Giuseppe Finzi	29 September 1940	10	5	30,760	Converted transport boat, seized after Armistice
Alpino Bagnolini	30 September 1940	11	2	6,926	Converted transport boat, seized after Armistice
Emo	3 October 1940	6	2	10,958	Returned Mediterranean, August 1941
Capitano Tarantini	5 October 1940	2	—	—	Sunk HMS Thunderbolt, 15 December 1940
Luigi Torelli	5 October 1940	12	7	42,871	Converted to transport boat, seized after Armistice
Comandante Faà di Bruno	5 October 1940	2	—	—	Lost, all hands, October 1940
Otaria	6 October 1940	8	1	4,662	Returned Mediterranean, September 1941
Maggiore Baracca	6 October 1940	6	3	8,989	Sunk HMS Croome, 8 September 1941
Reginaldo Giuliani	6 October 1940	3	3	13,603	To Gdynia as training boat, converted, seized at Armistice
Glauco	22 October 1940	5	—	—	Sunk HMS Wishart, 27 June 1941
Pietro Calvi	23 October 1940	8	6	34,193	Sunk HMS Lulworth, on 15 July 1942
Enrico Tazzoli	24 October 1940	9	18	96,650	Converted to transport boat, lost, all hands May 1943
Argo	24 October 1940	6	1	5,066	Returned Mediterranean, October 1941
Leonardo da Vinci	31 October 1940	11	17	120,243	Lost, all hands, May 1943 (Note: Best performing non-German submarine in World War II. Blair lists 13 ships totalling 90,415 GRT only for BETASOM, with the 4 ships totalling 29,828 GRT sunk in the Indian Ocean counted separate.)
Veniero	2 November 1940	6	2	4,987	Returned Mediterranean, August 1941
Nani	4 November 1940	3	2	1,939	Lost, all hands, January 1941
Comandante Cappellini	5 November 1940	12	5	31,648	Converted to transport boat, seized after Armistice
Morosini	28 November 1940	9	6	40,933	Lost, all hands, August 1942
Marcello	2 December 1940	3	1	1,550	Lost, all hands, February 1941
Michele Bianchi	18 December 1940	4	3	22,266	Sunk, all hands, HMS Tigris, 4 July 1941
Brin	18 December 1940	5	2	7,241	Returned Mediterranean, August–September 1941
Velella	25 December 1940	4	—	—	Returned Mediterranean, August 1941
Mocenigo	26 December 1940	4	1	1,253	Returned Mediterranean, August 1941

=== Ex-Red Sea submarines ===
In 1941, the four surviving Italian submarines based in Italian East Africa (Africa Orientale Italiana, AOI) sailed around the Cape of Good Hope to BETASOM after the fall of colony during the East African Campaign.

Red Sea submarines, transferred to BETASOM
Name	Arrival	Patrol	Ships sunk	GRT	Notes
Archimede	7 May 1941	3	2	25,629	Sunk by aircraft, 15 April 1943
Guglielmotti	7 May 1941	—	—	—	Returned Mediterranean, September–October 1941
Galileo Ferraris	9 May 1941	1	—	—	Sunk HMS Lamerton, 25 October 1941
Perla	19 May 1941	—	—	—	Coastal boat, returned Mediterranean, September–October 1941

In 1941, it was decided to return some of the boats to the Mediterranean. Perla, Guglielmotti, Brin, Argo, Velella, Dandolo, Emo, Otaria, Mocenigo, and Veniero made the passage. Glauco also made the return voyage but was sunk by the Royal Navy off Cape Spartel. The submarine cruiser Ammiraglio Cagni was dispatched from the Mediterranean to patrol off South Africa in October 1942. On completion she returned to Bordeaux, transferring to BETASOM in February 1943. She was converted there for transport to the Far East but was overtaken by the Italian Armistice in September 1943 and was interned at Durban.

=== Ammiraglio Cagni ===
Submarine cruiser, transferred to BETASOM
Name	Arrival	Patrol	Ships sunk	GRT	Notes
Ammiraglio Cagni	20 February 1943	2	2	5,840	Converted to transport submarine, interned at Armistice

== Post-war ==
The submarine pens have proved to be infeasible to demolish due to their massive reinforced construction which had been designed to withstand aerial bombardment. As of 2010, after conversion several years previously, approximately 12,000 m^{2} (130,000 sq ft) of the 42,000 m^{2} (450,000 sq ft) building are open to the public as a cultural centre for the performing arts, exhibitions and evening events.
