= Glauco =

Glauco is a given name. Notable people with the name include:

- Glauco Villas Boas (1957–2010), Brazilian cartoonist and illustrator
- Glauco (footballer, born 1993), Brazilian footballer
- Glauco (footballer, born 1995), Brazilian footballer

See also

- Italian submarine Glauco
