= Angelo Parona =

Italian admiral

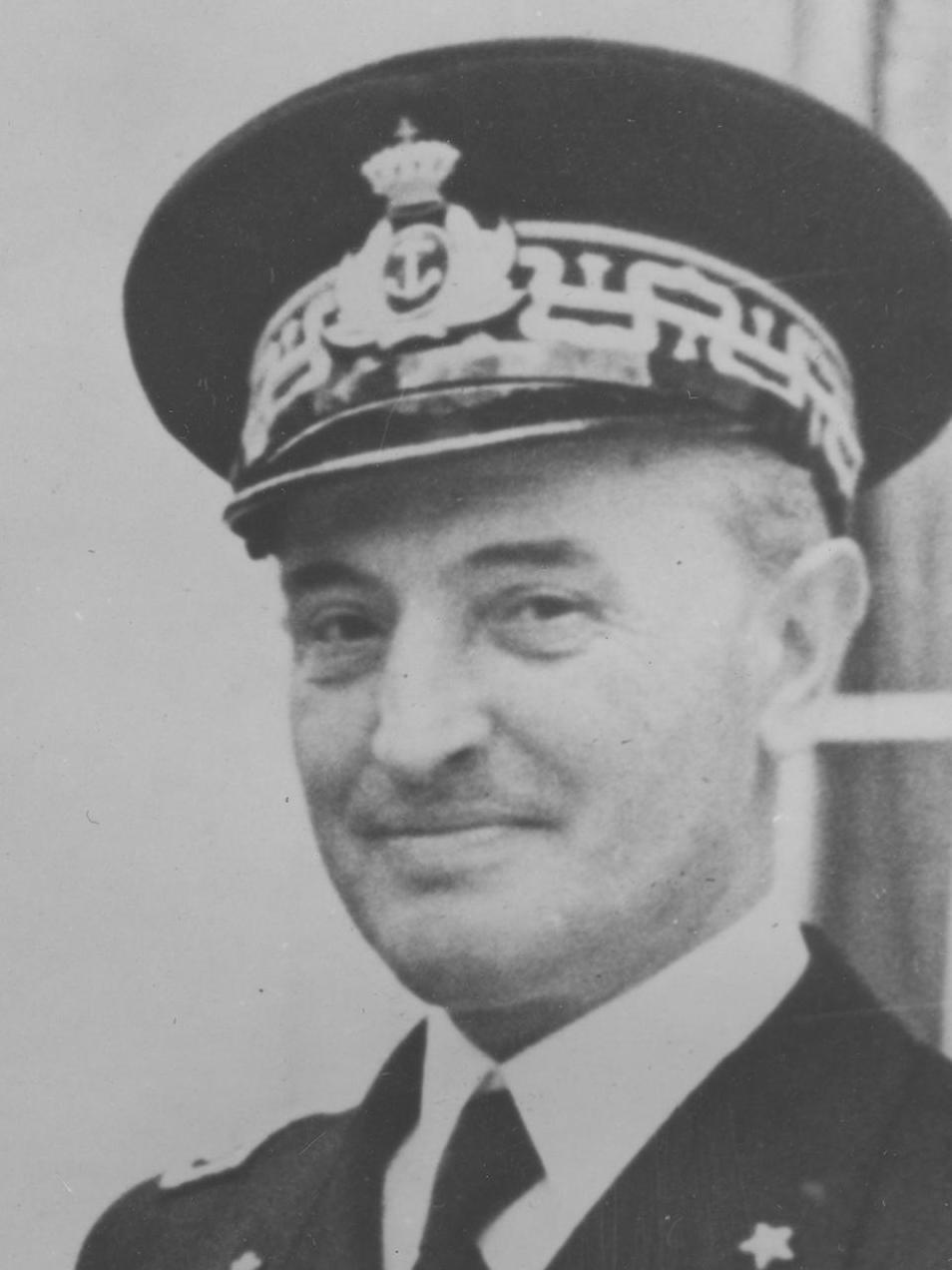
- Angelo Parona in 1941
- Born: 23 April 1889; Novara, Piedmont, Kingdom of Italy
- Died: 14 May 1977 (aged 88); Rome, Lazio, Italy
- Military career
- Allegiance: Kingdom of Italy (1906-46); Italy (1946-51)
- Branch: Regia Marina (1906-46); Italian Navy (1946-51)
- Service years: 1906–1951
- Rank: Ammiraglio di Divisione (Vice Admiral)
- Commands: F 17 (submarine); Trieste (heavy cruiser); BETASOM; 3rd Naval Division
- Conflicts: Italo-Turkish War; World War I; Battles of the Isonzo; Adriatic Campaign; World War II; Battle of the Atlantic; Battle of the Mediterranean; First Battle of Sirte; Second Battle of Sirte; Operation Vigorous; Operation Pedestal
- Awards: Silver Medal of Military Valor; Bronze Medal of Military Valor; War Cross for Military Valor; War Merit Cross (three times); Iron Cross First Class; Iron Cross Second Class

Angelo Parona (23 April 1889 – 14 May 1977) was an Italian admiral during World War II.

== Early life and career ==
Parona was born in Novara, Piedmont, on 23 April 1889, son of Emilio Parona and Elena Tarella. He entered the Naval Academy in Livorno in 1906 and graduated in 1910 with the rank of ensign. He participated in the Italo-Turkish War on board the armored cruiser Varese; when Italy entered World War I, Parona, by then a lieutenant, was assigned to the ironclad battleship Sardegna.

During World War I, Parona initially took part in ground fighting on the Isonzo front with the Naval Brigade; he was awarded a Silver Medal of Military Valor for an action near Monfalcone in May 1916. Later in the war, he was given command of the submarine F 17, distinguishing himself and receiving a Bronze Medal of Military Valor for an action against a convoy in the Adriatic Sea in July 1918.

He remained in the submarine branch even after World War I; he was promoted to lieutenant commander in 1922 and to commander in 1927. After attending the Naval Warfare Institute, he was assigned for three years to the office of the Chief of Staff of the Navy. In 1932 Parona, together with Captain Vladimiro Pini, translated in Italian Hermann Bauer's Das Unterseeboot: Seine and Bedeutg als Teil. fleets; Seine Stellg im Völkerrecht; Seine Kriegsverwendg; Seine Zukunft, a treatise on the design and the tactical use of the U-Boat. Promoted to captain in 1937, for the next two years Parona held the office of naval attaché at the Embassy of Italy in Paris.

Between August 1936 and August 1937 Parona was the commanding officer of the heavy cruiser Trieste, and then he became chief of staff of the 3rd Naval Division. In 1938, after promotion to rear admiral, he became deputy inspector of the construction and testing of the new ships built for the Navy, and then head of cabinet of the Ministry of the Navy in Rome.

== World War II and aftermath ==
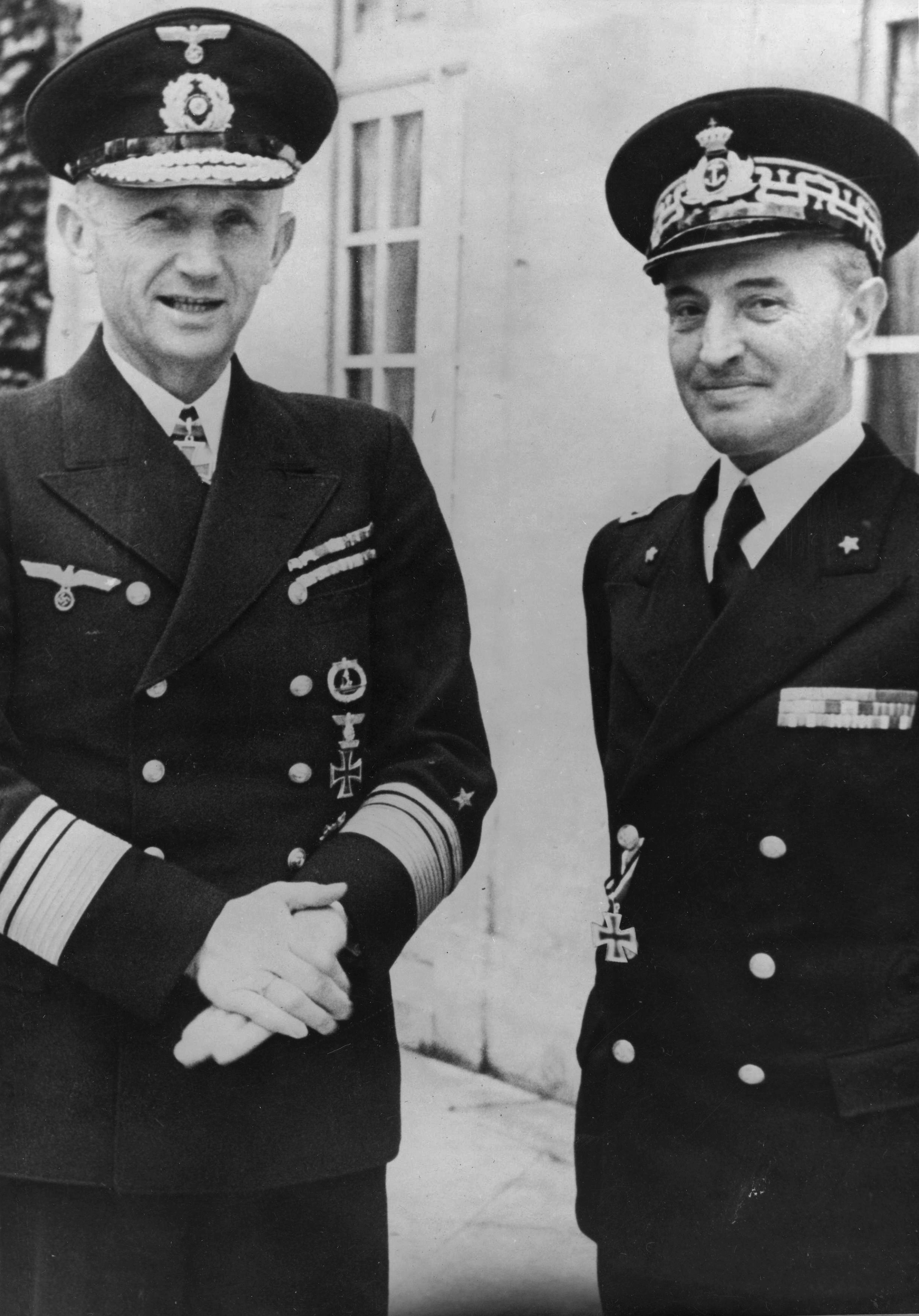
Parona and his German counterpart Admiral Karl Dönitz, 1941

When Italy entered World War II on 10 June 1940, Parona held the post deputy commander of Italy's submarine fleet.

During a military conference in Friedrichshafen on 20 June 1939, the Regia Marina and the Kriegsmarine had agreed that Italy would participate in the submarine warfare in the Atlantic, and that an Italian Atlantic submarine base would be created in German-held territory. On 25 July 1940, after the fall of France, the Ministry of the Navy sanctioned the establishment of the Italian Atlantic Command and appointed Parona commander of the 21st Submarine Group, that would operate in the Atlantic. In August 1940 Parona, together with German Admiral Eberhard Weichold (the Kriegsmarine liaison officer in Italy), visited a number of ports on the Atlantic coast and chose Bordeaux as the basis for the Italian submarines. Supermarina, the high command of the Italian Navy, validated the choice and decided that from 1 September 1940 the command of the Atlantic Submarine Group would be created; its official denomination would be High command of the Italian Submarine Forces in the Atlantic, better known BETASOM.

Parona arrived in Bordeaux at the end of August 1940 and quickly organized the new base. Admiral Karl Dönitz and the Seekriegsleitung judged Parona favourably, for his cleverness, determination and readiness to cooperate with the German commands, while some Italian admirals considered him excessively "pro-German" and thought that he overestimated the capacity of the Italian submarines and their inexperienced crews, completely unprepared for the Atlantic conditions, to operate in the Northern Atlantic. Italian submarines started to operate in the Atlantic in the summer of 1940, but achieved little success; Parona, disappointed by the initial results of his submarines, reprimanded harshly several of his submarine commanders, whom he expected should be able to obtain a performance comparable to that of the U-Boats, disregarding their lack of experience, inadequate rules, and technical defects of the boats. Parona's excessive sternness caused frictions both between him and some of his commanders, and between him and Supermarina, the latter recommending that he should tone down his criticism and be less influenced by the Germans.

At the end of 1940, Parona ordered several measures that aimed to improve the performance of his submarines: taking cue from the Kriegsmarine, older Italian submarine commanders (some were 40 years old) were replaced with younger officers, who possessed more aggressiveness and stamina; a "submarine school" was created in Gotenhafen, where commanders, officers and bridge crews of the Betasom submarines were trained according to the German model (the submarine Reginaldo Giuliani was assigned to this task, in cooperation with German naval units). Italian submarines also underwent improvement work, such as the reshaping of their excessively large turrets. These measures significantly improved the performance of the Italian submarines; from mid-1941, Italian submarine started to achieve more success (the average tonnage sunk by Betasom submarines would rise from 3,844 GRT in 1940 to 27,335 GRT in 1942). Parona, however, was still unsatisfied, and this led to new frictions between him and Supermarina for his severe treatment of some commanders. In April 1941, meanwhile, he had been promoted to vice admiral. In Autumn 1941, about half of the Betasom submarines were sent back to Italy, as they were highly needed for operations in the Mediterranean, and this made Parona's rank excessive for the size of his command; in September 1941, therefore, he was replaced by Captain Romolo Polacchini as the commander of Betasom.

Back in Italy, in November 1941 Parona was given command of the 3rd Cruiser Division, after its commander, Bruno Brivonesi, had been removed from command after the Battle of the Duisburg Convoy. His flagship was the heavy cruiser Gorizia. As the commander of the 3rd Cruiser Division, between December 1941 and August 1942 Parona participated in the First and Second Battle of Sirte, where his division clashed with the escorting forces of British convoys to Malta, Operation Vigorous (known in Italy as the Battle of Mid June) and Operation Pedestal (known in Italy as the Battle of Mid August), where his force did not make contact with enemy ships.

In December 1942 the 3rd Cruiser Division (by then down to the heavy cruisers Trieste and Gorizia), in the face of increasing Allied bombings against Italian naval base in Southern Italy, was transferred to La Maddalena, Sardinia. On 10 April 1943, 84 USAAF bombers attacked La Maddalena and the 3rd Division; Trieste was sunk and Gorizia was disabled, thus effectively annihilating Parona's command.

He was then transferred to the Navy Ministry in Rome, where he became the director of military personnel and services. He was in Rome when the armistice of Cassibile was announced. According to one source, after the war the High Commissioner for the Epuration of the Public Administration accused him of not opposing the Germans while in Rome in the days of the armistice; of having left all the documentation of his office to Captain Carmine D'Arienzo, who was known to have adhered to the Italian Social Republic; and of having written a list of all the officers of the Italian Navy in Rome on September 8, which then ended up in German hands. According to the official history of the Italian Navy, published in 1971, Parona instead had the list destroyed and, during the German occupation of Rome, co-operated with the Clandestine Military Front, a Resistance organization that included several high-ranking officers of the Italian armed forces.

After the liberation of Rome, Parona resumed active service and was appointed Commander of the Naval Department of the Ionian Sea (with headquarters in Taranto), a role that he held from 1944 to 1946. In 1945 he was promoted to admiral.

From 1948 to 1951 he was responsible for the permanent lighting of coasts and headlights. He was placed in the reserve in 1951. Parona died in Rome on 14 May 1977.
