= Italian ship Agostino Barbarigo =

Agostino Barbarigo or simply Barbarigo was the name of at least two ships of the Italian Navy named in honour of Agostino Barbarigo and may refer to:

- Agostino Barbarigo, a sloop of the Regia Marina, built in Venice in 1879.
- Italian submarine Agostino Barbarigo, a Barbarigo-class submarine launched in 1917 and discarded in 1928.
- Italian submarine Barbarigo, a Marcello-class submarine launched in 1938 and sunk in 1943.
