= Italian submarine Otaria =

Otaria was the name of at least two ships of the Italian Navy and may refer to:

- Italian submarine Otaria (1908), a Glauco-class submarine (1905) launched in 1905 and discarded in 1918.
- Italian submarine Otaria (1935), a Glauco-class submarine initially ordered by Portugal as Espadarte but cancelled before launch and acquired by Italy. She was launched in 1935 and discarded in 1948.
