= Mario Arillo =

Italian naval officer

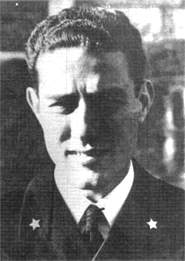
- Born: 25 March 1912; La Spezia, Liguria, Italy
- Died: 27 September 2000 (aged 88); La Spezia, Liguria, Italy
- Military career
- Allegiance: Kingdom of Italy; Italian Social Republic
- Branch: Regia Marina; Marina Nazionale Repubblicana
- Service years: 1927–1945
- Commands: Ambra (submarine); S 5 (submarine); Tyrrhenian Command (M.N.R.)
- Conflicts: World War II; Raid on Algiers
- Awards: Gold Medal of Military Valor; Silver Medal of Military Valor (twice); Bronze Medal of Military Valor; Iron Cross Second Class

Mario Arillo (25 March 1912 – 27 September 2000) was an Italian naval officer during World War II.

== Biography ==
Arillo was born in La Spezia on 25 March 1912, the son of Gaetano, a non-commissioned officer in the Italian Navy, and Silvia Piran. In October 1927 he entered the Italian Naval Academy in Livorno, attending a course of five years. In July 1932 he graduated as ensign and was assigned to the heavy cruiser Trieste; between April and May 1933 he was executive officer on the torpedo boat Francesco Stocco. In July 1933 he was promoted to sub-lieutenant and embarked again on Trieste, and in September he was transferred to the destroyer Giovanni da Verrazzano, where he remained until October 1934.

In July 1935 he was assigned to the destroyer Dardo, and from April to November 1936 he was executive officer on the submarine H 2, based in La Spezia. In July 1937 he was promoted to lieutenant, and from November 1936 until July 1938 he served on the heavy cruisers Trento and Trieste. He was then assigned on the light cruiser Luigi di Savoia Duca degli Abruzzi, where he was for six months the flag adjutant of Admiral Barzaghi, commander of the 3rd Naval Division.

From July 1938 to September 1940 he served at the Naval Academy, and then, after the beginning of World War II, he was assigned to the submarine Ettore Fieramosca for submarine command training. On 19 January 1941 he was given command of the submarine Ambra. At 03:07 on 31 March 1941, while on patrol on the route between Alexandria and Souda, he torpedoed and sank north of Sollum (Egypt) the light cruiser HMS Bonaventure. The cruiser sank very quickly in position 33°20' N, 26°35' E, after being hit by two torpedoes on the starboard side, with the loss of 148 crewmen, while the 310 survivors were rescued by the destroyer Hereward.

In July 1941, after the failed attack on the port of Valletta by the Decima Flottiglia MAS, Arillo met Lieutenant Commander Junio Valerio Borghese and decided to join the flotilla, which had suffered heavy losses in the attack on Malta. It was then decided to modify Ambra in order to enable it to transport SLC manned torpedoes. In May 1942 he carried SLCs to Alexandria in a failed attempt to repeat the success of the previous raid in December 1941. In December 1942 he carried three SLC manned torpedoed and ten frogmen that carried out a successful raid on Algiers, sinking two merchant ships and disabling two more. For this raid, Arillo received the Gold Medal of Military Valor.

In June 1943, Arillo (who had been meanwhile promoted to lieutenant commander) went to Danzig to take command of the new submarine S 5, a Type VII U-boat transferred to the Regia Marina. The boat was formally handed over to the Italian Navy on 31 July, and Arillo was its commander until the proclamation of the Armistice of Cassibile on 8 September 1943. On the evening of that day, he was in Danzig for a dinner with the Italian consul, and was temporarily holding command of Submarine Group "S", when the Group Command was informed of the armistice by an EIAR radio communiqué. The Germans, who had been aware of the armistice already for a few hours, immediately summoned Arillo to the local Kriegsmarine command, demanding the delivery of the submarines, but obtained a refusal. The German command initially allowed the submarines in Gdansk to remain in Italian hands, flying the Italian flags, but on September 19 the boats were formally returned to the Kriegsmarine, while the crews, gathered on board the steamer Deutschland, had to choose whether to join the Italian Social Republic or be interned in a prisoner-of-war camp. Of the approximately five hundred Italians present, about sixty refused to continue fighting, and were interned in Germany.

Together with about four hundred seamen, Arillo was repatriated to Northern Italy, and joined the Marina Nazionale Repubblicana where he became one of Borghese's right hand men. He was appointed head of the Tyrrhenian Command, with headquarters in Genoa and jurisdiction from San Remo to the southern front.

In April 1945, a few hours before the end of the war in Italy, Arillo had a significant role in saving the port of Genoa, which the retreating Germans planned to blow up. He deployed his men and weapons inside the harbour, preventing anyone from entering or approaching. He was then taken prisoner by British forces and initially imprisoned in Afragola, from where he was sent to a POW camp in Algeria, then repatriated to Italy in January 1946 and sent to POW camp "S" near Taranto, from where he escaped in April of that year.

Immediately after the war, he participated in the operations of mine clearing of the Italian ports, but he was subjected to an 'epuration' process and had to leave the military, demoted to the rank of lieutenant. He was subsequently reinstated in his former rank following a decision of a commission chaired by Admiral Vladimiro Pini.

After leaving the Navy, Arillo graduated in engineering, but remained in the Naval Reserve, where he was promoted to the rank of commander and later captain. He died in La Spezia on 27 September 2000.
