= Raid on Algiers =

Italian frogman raid on Allied ships in Algiers harbour in 1942

Coordinates: 36°45′36″N 3°4′44″E

- Part of the battle of the Mediterranean during World War II
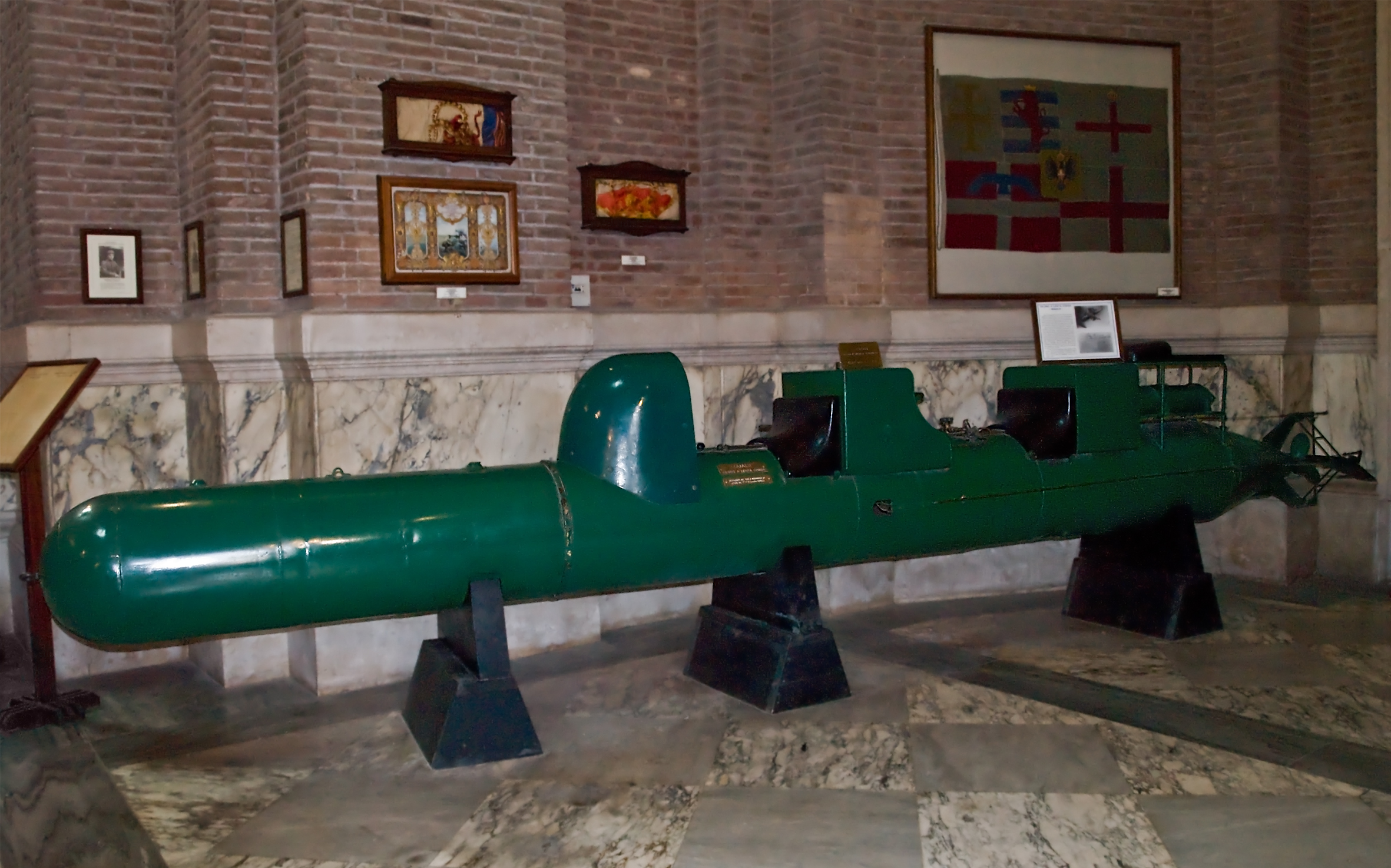
- Italian manned torpedo
Date	11 December 1942
Location	Algiers, French Algeria
Result	Italian victory

Belligerents
United Kingdom; United States; Norway	Italy

Commanders and leaders
(United Kingdom) Morgan Morgan-Giles	(Kingdom of Italy) Mario Arillo

Strength
Harbour defences	1 submarine 3 Human torpedoes 10 frogmen

Casualties and losses
1 cargo ship sunk 1 tanker damaged 2 cargo ships damaged 1 military transport ship damaged	16 captured

The Raid on Algiers, known in Italy as Operation N.A. 1 (Italian: Operazione N.A. 1), took place on 11 December 1942, in the Algiers harbour. Italian manned torpedoes and commando frogmen from the Decima Flottiglia MAS were brought to Algiers aboard the Perla-class submarine Ambra. The participating commandos were captured after setting limpet mines which sank two Allied ships and damaged two more.

== Raid ==
On 4 December 1942, Ambra, a submarine of the Regia Marina (the Italian Royal Navy]), left the naval base of La Spezia, carrying three manned torpedoes and 10 commando frogmen. Air reconnaissance had discovered that the port of Algiers was crowded with Allied cargo ships, so the Italian High Command decided to launch an operation involving both human torpedoes and combat swimmers carrying limpet mines. On the evening of 10 December, Ambra reached Algiers at a depth of 18 m (59 ft). One of the swimmers was employed as scout on the surface, and he guided the submarine toward a position 2,000 m (6,600 ft) from the southern entrance to the harbour. He spotted six steamers at 21:45, and informed the presence of targets to Ambra by phone.

The other swimmers and the manned torpedoes begun to emerge at 23:45 after some delay. The observer reported an intense reaction from the harbour defences. The submarine awaited to recover the operators until 03:00, an hour after the original time set. Then the scout swimmer was recalled on board and Ambra departed back to La Spezia. At 05:00, the explosions started to rock the freighters. The Norwegian Berta (1,493 GRT) was sunk, while Ocean Vanquisher (7,174 GRT), Empire Centaur (7,041 GRT) and Armatan (4,587 GRT) were severely damaged. The American Landing Ship Medium LSM-59 became stranded on the beach. Sixteen Italian divers were captured.
