= Italian submarine Velella =

Velella was the name of at least two ships of the Italian Navy and may refer to:

- Italian submarine Velella (1911), a Medusa-class submarine launched in 1911 and discarded in 1918.
- Italian submarine Velella (1936), an Argo-class submarine launched in 1936 and sunk in 1943.
