= Enzo Grossi =

Italian naval officer (1908–1960)

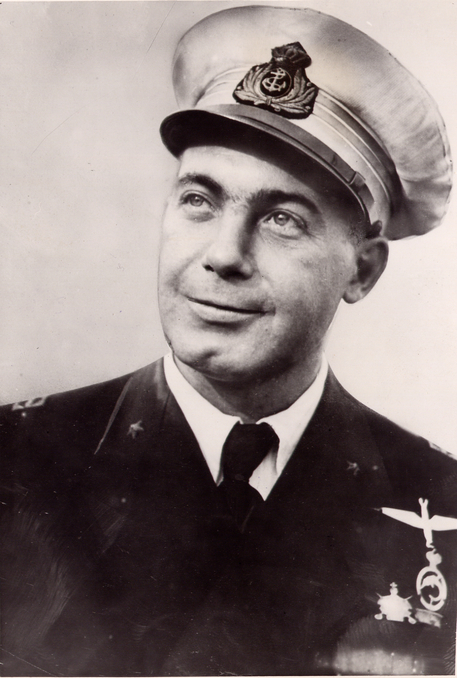
- Born: 20 April 1908; São Paulo, Brazil
- Died: 11 August 1960 (aged 52); Corato, Italy
- Military career
- Allegiance: Kingdom of Italy (1908-1943); Italian Social Republic (1943-1945)
- Branch: Regia Marina (Navy)
- Rank: Capitano di Vascello
- Commands: Barbarigo
- Conflicts: World War II
- Awards: Two Medaglie d'oro al valor militare (revoked); Silver Medal for Military Valor; Two Bronze Medals for Military Valor; War Cross for Military Valor; Knight's Cross of the Iron Cross; Iron Cross, 2nd Class; Iron Cross, 1st Class

Enzo Grossi (São Paulo, Brazil, 20 April 1908 - Corato, 11 August 1960); was an officer in the Regia Marina (Italian Navy) during World War II.

== Life and the Barbarigo affair ==
During World War II he commanded the submarines Medusa and Barbarigo. While commanding the latter, Grossi claimed that on May 20, 1942, he attacked and sank a Maryland-class battleship. He also claimed that he had likewise torpedoed and sank a Mississippi-class battleship on October 6, 1942. These attacks, widely publicized in Italy, gained him two Gold Medals of Military Valour and two promotions, respectively to Capitano di Fregata and to Capitano di Vascello, despite the doubts of his immediate superior, BETASOM commander Romolo Polacchini. On 29 December 1942, Grossi replaced Polacchini as commander of the Italian submarines in the Atlantic Ocean. After the Armistice of Cassibile, he joined the Repubblica Sociale Italiana, remaining to command the Atlantic base.

=== Postwar enquiries ===
After the war, Grossi fled abroad. A first enquiry in 1949 summarily concluded that Grossi and his crew had imagined everything, and stripped him of the promotions and medals he had received for the actions. Subsequently, in 1962 a new enquiry (motivated by imprecisions of the first one, also accused of being motivated by political reasons) concluded that the crew of the Barbarigo might have been under the belief of a successful attack, but criticized Grossi for his certainty about his sinkings, and did not restore his promotions and awards.

It was established that in the first attack, Grossi had unsuccessfully attacked the cruiser USS Milwaukee (CL-5), while on the second instance he had fired torpedoes at the corvette HMS Petunia (K79), which likewise missed.

== Awards ==
- Italian
  - Silver Medal for Military Valor (24 September 1940)
  - Bronze Medal for Military Valor (June 1941)
  - Bronze Medal for Military Valor (June 1942)
  - War Cross for Military Valor (1942)
- German
  - Iron Cross, 2nd Class
  - Iron Cross, 1st Class (11 September 1942)
  - Knight's Cross of the Iron Cross (7 October 1942)
