= USS Milwaukee (CL-5) =

Omaha-class light cruiser

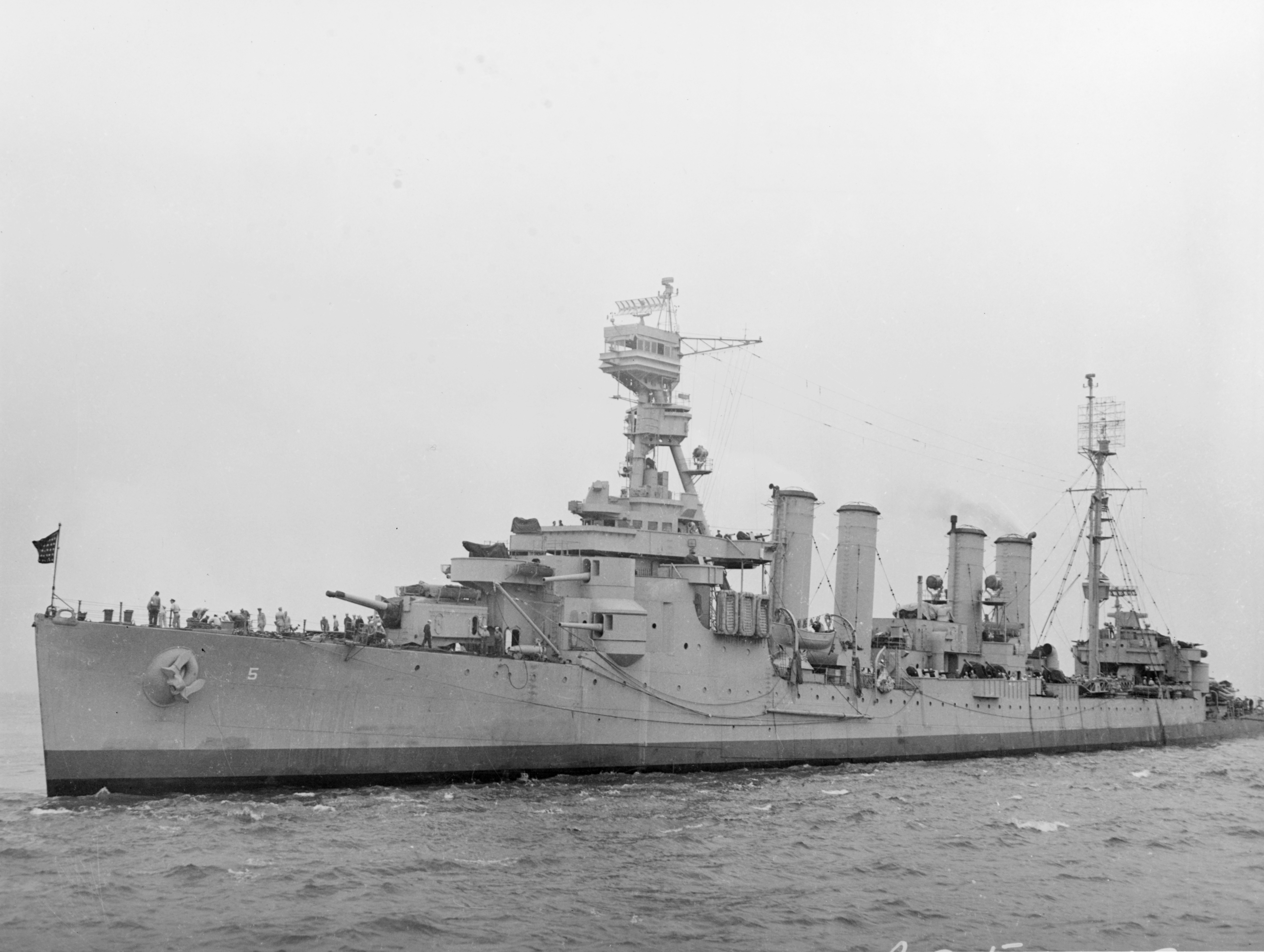
- USS Milwaukee in New York, 1943

History

United States
- Name: Milwaukee
- Namesake: City of Milwaukee, Wisconsin
- Awarded: 27 August 1917
- Builder: Todd Dry Dock and Construction Company
- Laid down: 13 December 1918
- Launched: 24 March 1921
- Sponsored by: Mrs. Rudolph Pfeil
- Commissioned: 20 June 1923
- Identification: Hull number: CL-5
- Fate: Loaned to the Soviet Union, 20 April 1944

Soviet Union
- Name: Murmansk
- Namesake: Murmansk
- Operator: Soviet Navy
- Acquired: 20 April 1944
- Renamed: 20 April 1944
- Fate: Returned to the United States, 16 March 1949

United States
- Name: Milwaukee
- Acquired: 16 March 1949
- Fate: Sold for scrap, 10 December 1949

General characteristics (as built)
- Class & type: Omaha-class light cruiser
- Displacement: 7,050 long tons (7,163 t) (standard)
- Length: 555 ft 6 in (169.32 m)
- Beam: 55 ft 4 in (16.87 m)
- Draft: 13 ft 6 in (4.11 m)
- Installed power: 90,000 shp (67,000 kW); 12 × Yarrow boilers
- Propulsion: 4 × shafts; 4 × geared steam turbines
- Speed: 35 kn (65 km/h; 40 mph)
- Range: 6,500 nmi (12,000 km; 7,500 mi) at 10 knots (19 km/h; 12 mph)
- Complement: 458 officers and enlisted men
- Armament: 2 × twin, 6 × single 6 in (152 mm) guns; 4 × single 3 in (76 mm) anti-aircraft guns; 10 × 21 in (533 mm) torpedo tubes; 224 mines
- Armor: Belt: 3 inches (76 mm); Deck: 1.5 inches (38 mm); Conning tower: 1.5 inches (38 mm); Bulkheads: 1.5–3 inches (38–76 mm)
- Aircraft carried: 2 × floatplanes
- Aviation facilities: 2 × catapults

USS Milwaukee (CL-5) was an Omaha-class light cruiser built for the United States Navy during the 1920s. The ship spent most of her early career assigned to the Asiatic and Battle Fleets. In 1941, she was assigned to the Neutrality Patrol until she was refitted in New York in late 1941. She escorted a troop convoy to the Pacific in early 1942 before returning to the South Atlantic where she patrolled for German commerce raiders and blockade runners. In November, she intercepted one of the latter, but it scuttled itself before it could be captured. In 1944, she was temporarily transferred to the Soviet Navy and commissioned as Murmansk. The ship was returned by the Soviets in 1949 and sold for scrap in December.

== Description ==
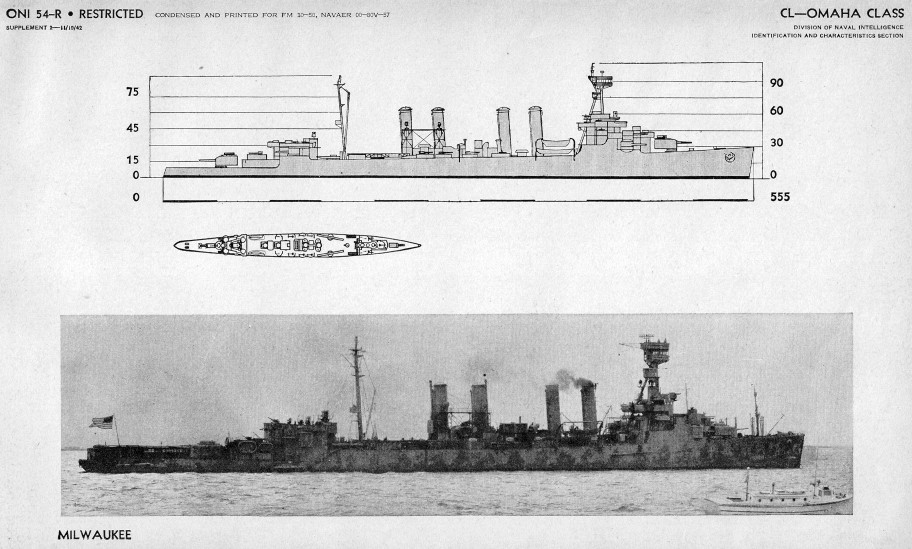
Right elevation drawing and photo of Milwaukee

Milwaukee was 550 feet (170 m) long at the waterline and 555 feet 6 inches (169.3 m) long overall, with a beam of 55 feet 4 inches (16.9 m) and a mean draft of 13 feet 6 inches (4.1 m). Her standard displacement was 7,050 long tons (7,163 t) and 9,150 long tons (9,297 t) at full load. Her crew consisted of 29 officers and 429 enlisted men. The ship was fitted with a powerful echo sounder.

The ship was powered by four Westinghouse geared steam turbines, each driving one propeller shaft, using steam generated by 12 Yarrow boilers. The engines were rated at 90,000 indicated horsepower (67,000 kW) and designed to reach a top speed of 35 knots (65 km/h; 40 mph). At deep load she carried 1,852 long tons (1,882 t) of fuel oil that provided her a range of 6,500 nautical miles (12,000 km; 7,500 mi) at a speed of 10 knots (19 km/h; 12 mph).

Milwaukee mounted a dozen 53-caliber 6-inch (152 mm) guns; four in two twin gun turrets and eight in tiered casemates fore and aft. Her secondary armament initially consisted of two 50-caliber 3-inch (76 mm) anti-aircraft (AA) guns in single mounts, but this was doubled to four guns during construction. Milwaukee was initially built with the capacity to carry 224 mines, but these were removed early in her career to make more space for crew accommodations. The ship carried above-water two triple and two twin torpedo tube mounts for 21-inch (533 mm) torpedoes. The triple mounts were fitted on the upper deck, aft of the aircraft catapults, and the twin mounts were one deck lower, covered by hatches in the side of the hull. These lower mounts proved to be very wet and were removed, and the openings plated over, before the start of World War II. Another change made before the war was to increase the 3-inch (76 mm) guns to four, all mounted in the ship's waist.

The ship lacked a full-length waterline armor belt. The sides of her boiler and engine rooms and steering gear were protected by 3 inches (76 mm) of armor. The transverse bulkheads at the end of her machinery rooms were 1.5 inches (38 mm) thick forward and three inches thick aft. The deck over the machinery spaces and steering gear had a thickness of 1.5 inches. The gun turrets were only protected against muzzle blast and the conning tower had 1.5 inches of armor. Milwaukee carried two floatplanes aboard that were stored on the two catapults. Initially these were probably Vought VE-9s, but the ship operated Curtiss SOC Seagulls from 1935 and Vought OS2U Kingfishers after 1940.

=== Wartime changes ===
After 1940 the lower aft six-inch guns were removed and the casemates plated over. The ship's anti-aircraft armament was augmented by two quadruple 1.1-inch gun mounts by early 1942, although these were replaced by twin Bofors 40 mm gun mounts later in the war. At about the same time, Milwaukee received eight Oerlikon 20 mm cannon.

== Service history ==
=== Inter-war period ===
The contract for Milwaukee, the third ship named for the city of Milwaukee, Wisconsin, was signed on 27 August 1917, and the ship was laid down by Todd Dry Dock and Construction Company, at their Tacoma, Washington shipyard on 13 December 1918. She was launched on 24 March 1921 and was commissioned on 20 June 1923. During the ship's shakedown cruise, she visited Sydney, Australia, during the Pan-Pacific Scientific Congress which opened on 23 August. With her new depth–finding equipment, Milwaukee surveyed the floor of the Pacific en route. "The Milwaukee Seamounts in the Northern Pacific are named after a set of soundings taken by Milwaukee in 1929."

During Fleet Problem VI, she collided with her sister ship Detroit in Guantanamo Bay, Cuba, on 1 February 1926, although neither ship was seriously damaged. Milwaukee and the destroyer Goff assisted victims of a fierce hurricane which had devastated the Isle of Pines in October. She was assigned to Cruiser Division 2 of the Asiatic Fleet in 1928. During an engagement with "enemy" cruisers during Fleet Problem IX on 16 April 1930, the ship was ruled to have been knocked out by the exercise's umpires. Three years later, during Fleet Problem XIV, Milwaukee was spotted by fighters from the aircraft carrier Saratoga and "sunk" by some of the opposing cruisers. In 1933, the ship was assigned to Cruiser Division 3 of the Battle Fleet. After the Panay Incident in December 1937, Milwaukee made a cruise through the Western Pacific from January to April 1938.

While steaming north of Hispaniola and Puerto Rico on 14 February 1939, Milwaukee discovered the deepest place in the Atlantic Ocean. The spot—which has a depth of 28,680 feet (8,740 m)—is now known as the "Milwaukee Deep". By January 1941, the ship had returned to Cruiser Division 2 which was now assigned to the Caribbean Patrol, commanded by Rear Admiral Jonas H. Ingram, part of the Neutrality Patrol established after the war began. Cruiser Division 2 was ordered to patrol the Atlantic between Trinidad, the Cape Verde Islands and the eastern bulge of Brazil in April, although Milwaukee was not immediately available. The ship, escorted by the destroyers Somers and Jouett, began her first patrol in May, making a port visit to Recife, Brazil, on 1 June, before returning to San Juan, Puerto Rico. These patrols continued in the same manner for most of the rest of the year.

=== World War II ===
==== South Atlantic ====
Milwaukee, commanded by Captain Forrest B. Royal, was being overhauled in the Brooklyn Navy Yard when the Japanese attacked Pearl Harbor on 7 December. The ship escorted a convoy to the Caribbean from New York on 31 December and then escorted eight troop transports from the Panama Canal to the Society Islands. She rejoined the South Atlantic Patrol Force upon her return and spend the next two years making patrols between Brazil and the African coast. On 19 May she received an SOS from the Brazilian cargo ship SS Commandante Lyra, which had been torpedoed by the Italian submarine Barbarigo off the coast of Brazil. Milwaukee found the freighter abandoned, burning, and listing to port. She rescued 25 survivors from their lifeboats, including the ship's master. Reinforced by her sister Omaha and the destroyer McDougal, the fires were brought under control, cargo was jettisoned to lighten the ship, and Commandante Lyra was towed to Fortaleza, Brazil. Shortly after, on the night of 20 May, she was attacked by the Barbarigo, commanded by Enzo Grossi (who mistook her for a "Maryland- or California- type battleship") with two torpedoes, which missed and were not even noticed by the American ships; however, Grossi claimed to have sunk his target, and was promoted to Capitano di Fregata (Commander) and decorated with the Gold Medal of Military Valour and the Iron Cross. Two subsequent commissions in 1949 and 1962 would eventually reverse the promotion and the decorations.

Rear Admiral Oliver M. Read assumed command of Cruiser Division 2 in October and hoisted his flag aboard Milwaukee. On 21 November, Milwaukee, her sister Cincinnati and the destroyer Somers intercepted the German blockade runner Anneliese Essberger. When Somers had closed to 4 miles (3.5 nmi; 6.4 km), the German ship scuttled herself to prevent capture. Milwaukee rescued 62 of the ship's crew. On 2 May 1943, while the ship was under repair at Recife, her crew helped to fight a fire on the oil tanker SS Livingston Roe. Milwaukee and Omaha collided on 31 May off the coast of Brazil, although the extent of the damage is not known. The ship sailed for the Brooklyn Navy Yard on 8 February 1944, preparatory to her temporary transfer to the Soviet Union in lieu of Italian ships allotted after the Italian surrender that could not be delivered. She escorted a convoy to Belfast, Northern Ireland, on 8 March before forming part of the escort of Convoy JW 58 during her voyage to Murmansk beginning on 29 March.

=== Soviet service ===
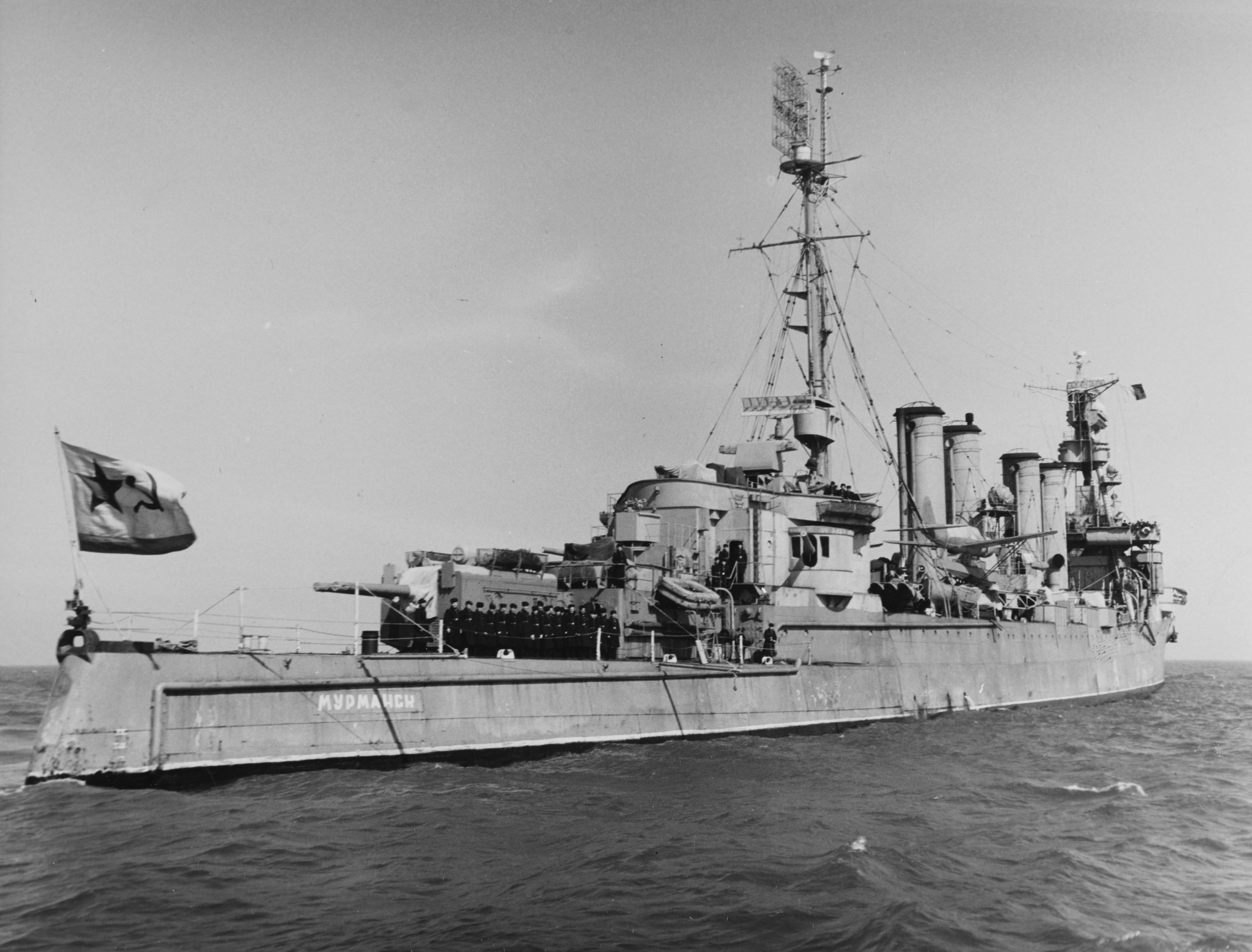
Murmansk off Lewes, Delaware, 8 March 1949

On 20 April, the ship was transferred on loan to the Soviet Northern Fleet in Murmansk. She was commissioned in the Soviet Navy as Murmansk and performed convoy and patrol duty in the Arctic Ocean for the remainder of the war. Afterward, she became a training ship and participated in the 1948 fleet maneuvers. On 16 March 1949, Milwaukee was transferred back to the United States. She was the first of 15 American warships returned by the Soviet Union. She entered the Philadelphia Naval Shipyard on 18 March 1949, and was sold for scrapping on 10 December to the American Shipbreakers, Inc. of Wilmington, Delaware.
