= HMS Shakespeare (P221) =

Submarine of the Royal Navy

Coordinates: 41°17′N 10°26′E

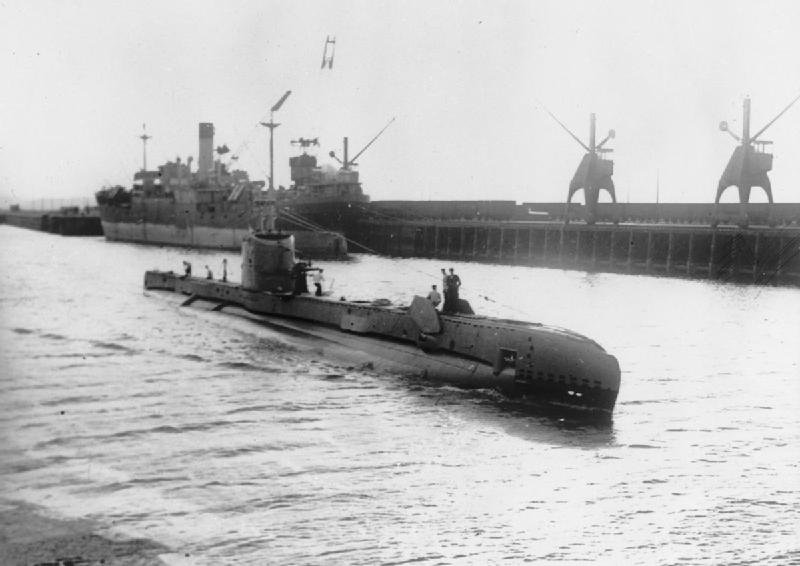
- Shakespeare moving in harbour

History

United Kingdom
- Name: Shakespeare
- Builder: Vickers-Armstrongs, Barrow-in-Furness
- Laid down: 13 November 1940
- Launched: 8 December 1941
- Commissioned: 10 July 1942
- Fate: Sold, 14 July 1946
- Badge

General characteristics
- Class & type: S-class submarine
- Displacement: 865 long tons (879 t) (surfaced); 990 long tons (1,010 t) (submerged)
- Length: 217 ft (66.1 m)
- Beam: 23 ft 9 in (7.2 m)
- Draught: 14 ft 8 in (4.5 m)
- Installed power: 1,900 bhp (1,400 kW) (diesel); 1,300 hp (970 kW) (electric)
- Propulsion: 2 × diesel engines; 2 × electric motors
- Speed: 15 kn (28 km/h; 17 mph) (surfaced); 10 kn (19 km/h; 12 mph) (submerged)
- Range: 6,000 nmi (11,000 km; 6,900 mi) at 10 knots (19 km/h; 12 mph) (surfaced); 120 nmi (220 km; 140 mi) at 3 knots (5.6 km/h; 3.5 mph) (submerged)
- Test depth: 300 ft (91.4 m)
- Complement: 48
- Sensors & processing systems: Type 129AR or 138 ASDIC; Type 291 early-warning radar
- Armament: 7 × 21 in (533 mm) torpedo tubes (6 × bow, 1 × stern); 1 × 3 in (76 mm) deck gun; 1 × 20 mm (0.8 in) AA gun

HMS Shakespeare was an S-class submarine built for the Royal Navy during the Second World War, and part of the Third Group built of that class. She was built by Vickers-Armstrongs and launched on 8 December 1941.

== Design and description ==
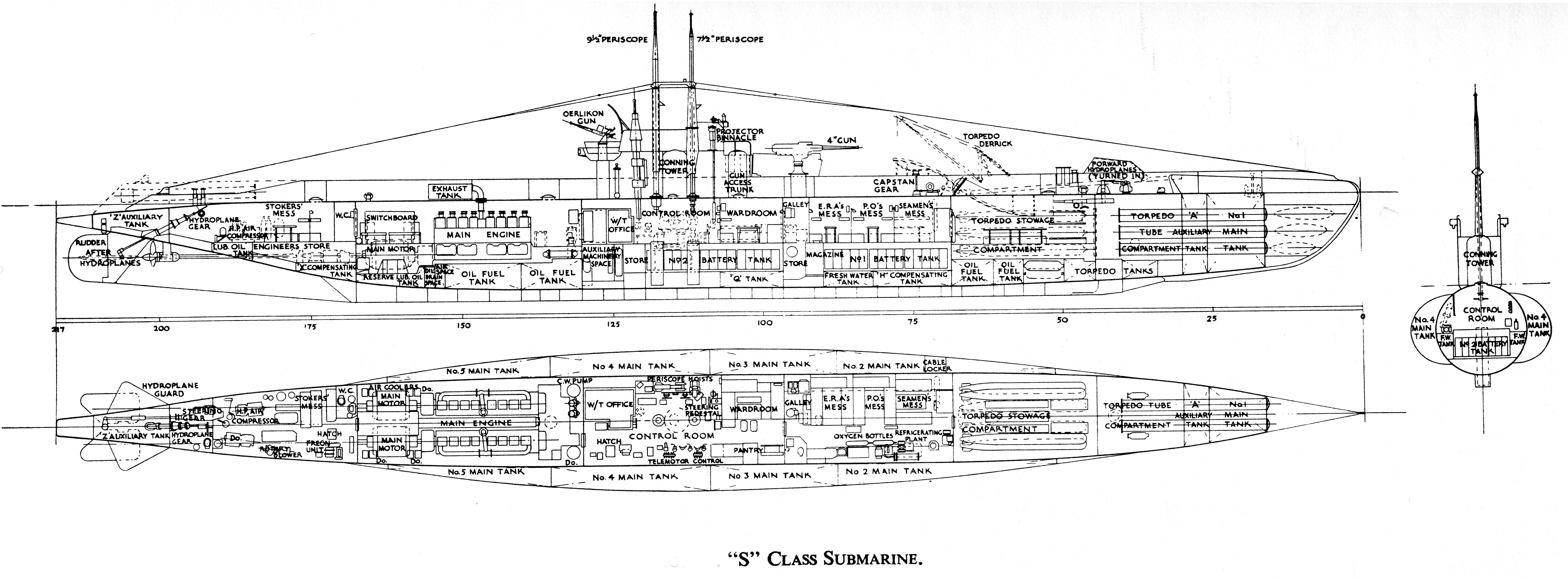
Schematic drawing of a S-class submarine

The S-class submarines were designed to patrol the restricted waters of the North Sea and the Mediterranean Sea. The third batch was slightly enlarged and improved over the preceding second batch of the S-class. The submarines had a length of 217 feet (66.1 m) overall, a beam of 23 feet 9 inches (7.2 m) and a draught of 14 feet 8 inches (4.5 m). They displaced 865 long tons (879 t) on the surface and 990 long tons (1,010 t) submerged. The S-class submarines had a crew of 48 officers and ratings. They had a diving depth of 300 feet (91.4 m).

For surface running, the boats were powered by two 950-brake-horsepower (708 kW) diesel engines, each driving one propeller shaft. When submerged each propeller was driven by a 650-horsepower (485 kW) electric motor. They could reach 15 knots (28 km/h; 17 mph) on the surface and 10 knots (19 km/h; 12 mph) underwater. On the surface, the third-batch boats had a range of 6,000 nautical miles (11,000 km; 6,900 mi) at 10 knots (19 km/h; 12 mph) and 120 nmi (220 km; 140 mi) at 3 knots (5.6 km/h; 3.5 mph) submerged.

The boats were armed with seven 21 inch (533 mm) torpedo tubes. A half-dozen of these were in the bow and there was one external tube in the stern. They carried six reload torpedoes for the bow tubes for a total of thirteen torpedoes. Twelve mines could be carried in lieu of the internally stowed torpedoes. They were also armed with a 3-inch (76 mm) deck gun. It is uncertain if Shakespeare was completed with a 20-millimetre (0.8 in) Oerlikon light AA gun or had one added later. The third-batch S-class boats were fitted with either a Type 129AR or 138 ASDIC system and a Type 291 or 291W early-warning radar.

== Service history ==
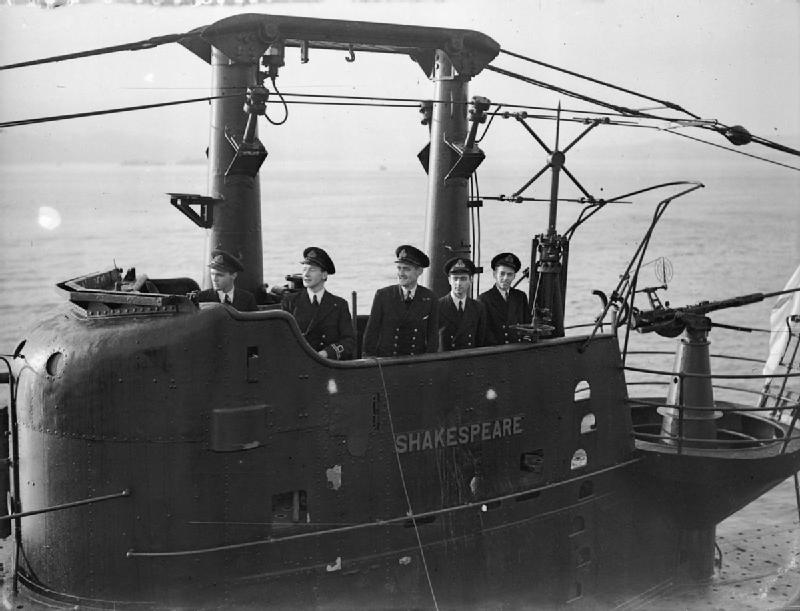
Shakespeare returning to Devonport after 19 months operational activity in the Mediterranean. The conning tower of the submarine is showing a 291W Air Warning Set.

She served in the Mediterranean and later in the Eastern Fleet during the Second World War, from December 1944. Whilst serving in the Mediterranean, she sank the Italian sailing vessels Sant' Anna M. and Adelina, the Greek sailing vessel Aghios Konstantinos and two unidentified sailing vessels. She also sank the Italian submarine Velella, which was lost with all hands, and unsuccessfully attempted to torpedo what is identified as an Italian light cruiser. On transferral to the Far East, she sank the Japanese merchant cargo ship Unryu Maru.

She was damaged by gunfire and air attack in the Nankauri Strait, Andaman Islands on 3 January 1945, whilst engaged with the Japanese auxiliary minesweeper Wa 1. Both ships were damaged. Shakespeare returned to port, but was written off as a constructive total loss.

She was sold on 14 July 1946 and was broken up by Thos. W. Ward, of Briton Ferry.
