= SS Navemar =

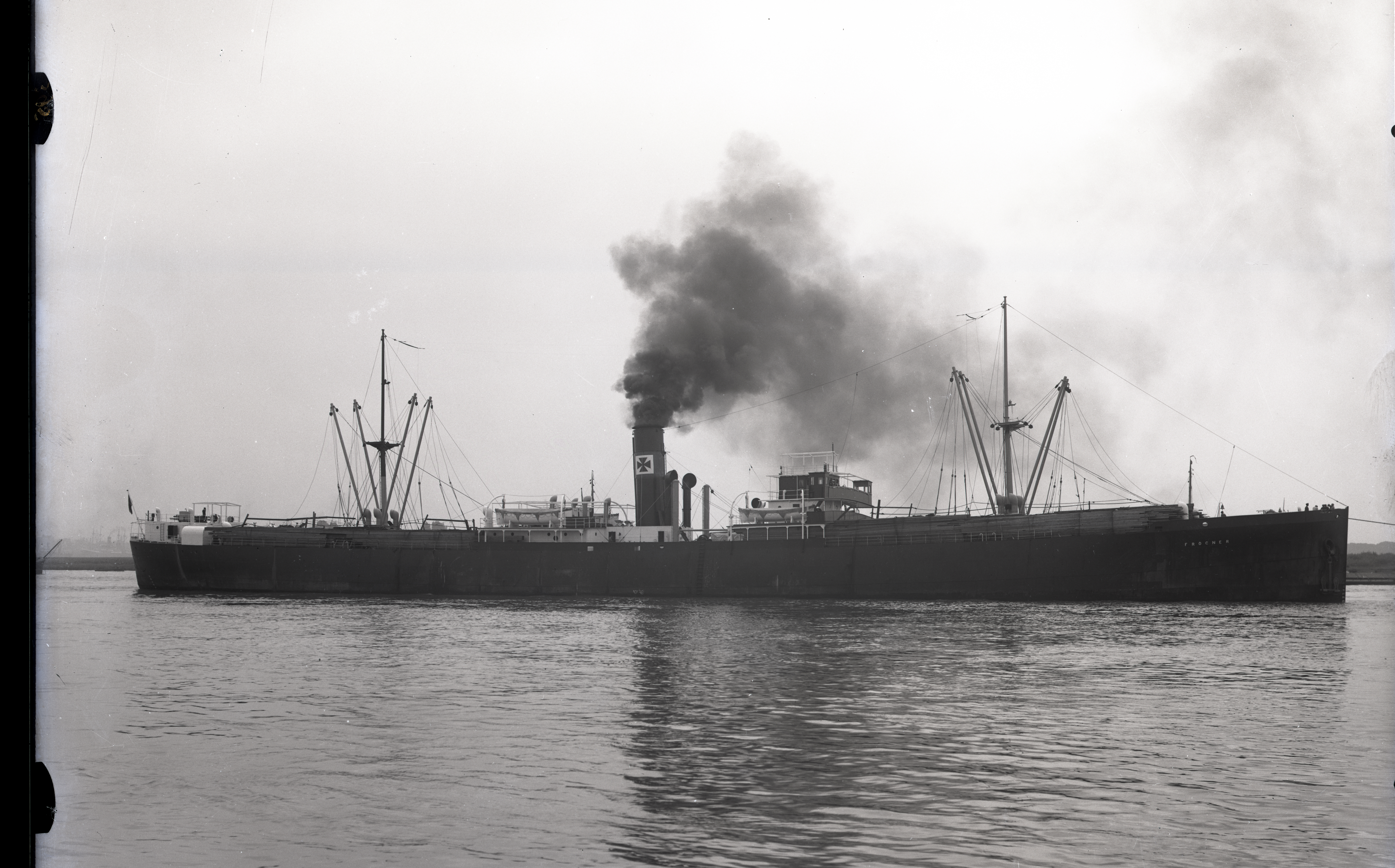
- Frogner

History
- Name: Frogner (1921–27); Cabo Mayor (1927–32); Navemar (1932–42)
- Owner: Fearnley and Eger (1921–27); Ybarra y Compania (1927–32); Compañía Española de Navegación Marítima (1932–42)
- Port of registry: (Norway) (1921–27); (Spain) / Seville (1927–42)
- Builder: Armstrong, Whitworth & Co, Newcastle upon Tyne
- Launched: 14 April 1921
- Completed: October 1921
- Identification: code letters MCGR (until 1933); call sign EADH (from 1934)
- Fate: Sunk by torpedo in the Strait of Gibraltar, 23 January 1942

General characteristics
- Type: Cargo ship
- Tonnage: 5,473 GRT; tonnage under deck 4,937; 3,291 NRT
- Length: 407.1 ft (124.1 m) p/p
- Beam: 53.8 ft (16.4 m)
- Draught: 27.9 ft (8.5 m)
- Depth: 30 ft 6 in (9.30 m)
- Installed power: 548 NHP
- Propulsion: 3-cylinder triple-expansion engine; single screw
- Capacity: 28 passengers
- Crew: 36

SS Navemar was a cargo steamship that was built in England in 1921, was Norwegian-owned until 1927 and then Spanish-owned for the rest of her career. An Italian submarine sank her in the Strait of Gibraltar in 1942.

Navemar is notable for a voyage in 1941 in which she carried about 1,120 European Jewish refugees to the United States in overcrowded and unsanitary conditions.

== Building ==
Armstrong, Whitworth & Co of Newcastle upon Tyne, United Kingdom built the ship as Frogner for Fearnley and Eger of Oslo, Norway, completing her in October 1921.

The ship was 407.1 ft (124.1 m) long between perpendiculars, had a beam of 58.3 ft (17.8 m) and a depth moulded of 30 ft 6 in (9.30 m). She had nine corrugated furnaces with a combined grate area of 183 square feet (17.0 m^{2}) heating three single-ended boilers with a combined heating surface of 8,112 square feet (753.6 m^{2}). Her boilers supplied steam at 180 lb_{f}/in^{2} to a three-cylinder triple expansion steam engine of 548 NHP that drove a single screw.

== Career 1921–41 ==
In 1927 Ybarra y Compania of Seville bought the ship and renamed her Cabo Mayor. In 1932 Compañía Española de Navegación Marítima bought her and renamed her Navemar.

On 22 December 1932 Navemar collided with the French steamship Bernardin de St. Pierre at Marseille, Bouches-du-Rhône, France, and was beached. She later was repaired and returned to service.

In 1937–38 Navemar was the subject of a court case in the United States between the Government of the Republic of Spain and the ship's crew, who were trying to prevent her from being requisitioned in the Spanish Civil War. The Supreme Court of the United States ruled in favour of the Spanish Government.

== Refugee voyage ==
In 1941, the American Jewish Joint Distribution Committee (known as "The Joint") were desperate to rescue Jewish refugees from Germany, Austria and Czechoslovakia escaping Nazi persecution. Many held US visas that were about to expire. The Joint's agents directed them to Seville, where the Navemar had been privately chartered to make the transatlantic crossing. Tickets for the few passenger cabins sold at exorbitant prices. The captain vacated his cabin and charged $2,000 to all who could fit themselves into the small space. Bunks were fitted in the filthy cargo holds, which had previously carried coal. Although attempts were made to clean the ship, there was too little time to complete the task.

Navemar left Seville on 7 August 1941. She called at Lisbon in Portugal, where many of the visas were extended by the US Embassy. After calling at Havana in Cuba she reached New York on 12 September 1941. Many of the passengers had contracted typhus and six of them died in the five-week crossing.

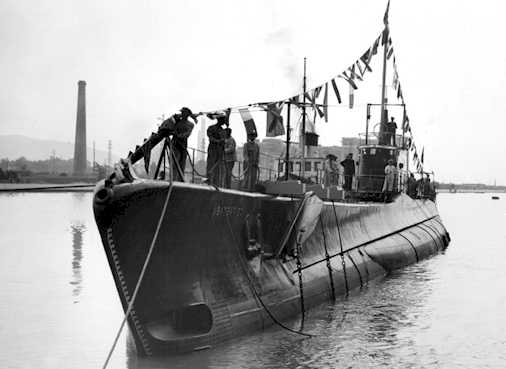
The Marcello-class Italian submarine Barbarigo, which sank Navemar in 1942

== Subsequent career and fate ==
After her refugee voyage Navemar returned to general trade. On 23 January 1942 the Marcello-class Italian submarine Barbarigo torpedoed and sank her in the Strait of Gibraltar.

== Sources ==
- Agar, Herbert (1960). The Saving Remnant: An Account Of Survival. New York: The Viking Press. p. 136.
