= Italian submarine Glauco =

Glauco was the name of at least two ships of the Italian Navy and may refer to:

- Italian submarine Glauco (1905), a Glauco-class submarine (1905) launched in 1905 and discarded in 1916.
- Italian submarine Glauco (1935), a Glauco-class submarine initially ordered by Portugal as Delfim but cancelled before launch and acquired by Italy. She was launched in 1935 and lost in 1941.

== See also ==
- Glauco
