= Italian submarine Barbarigo =

1938 Marcello-class submarine

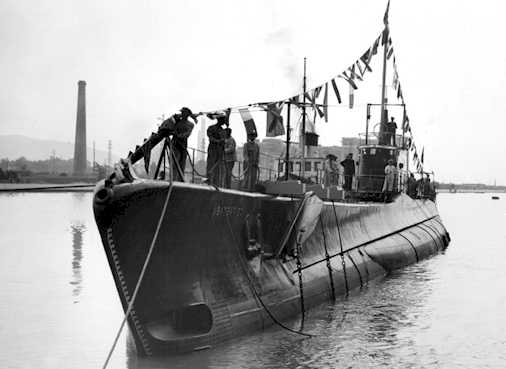
- Barbarigo

History

Italy
- Name: Barbarigo
- Namesake: Agostino Barbarigo
- Builder: CRDA
- Launched: 12 June 1938
- Commissioned: 19 September 1938
- Fate: Presumed sunk, c. 17–19 June 1943

General characteristics
- Class & type: Marcello-class submarine
- Displacement: 1,060 long tons (1,077 t) surfaced; 1,313 long tons (1,334 t) submerged
- Length: 73 m (239 ft 6 in)
- Beam: 7.19 m (23 ft 7 in)
- Draught: 5.1 m (16 ft 9 in)
- Propulsion: Diesel-electric; 2 × CRDA diesels; 2 × CRDA electric motors
- Speed: 17.4 knots (20.0 mph; 32.2 km/h) surfaced; 8 knots (9.2 mph; 15 km/h) submerged
- Complement: 58
- Armament: 8 × 533 mm (21 in) torpedo tubes (4 bow, 4 stern); 2 × 100 mm (4 in)/47 guns; 4 × 13.2 mm (0.52 in) machine guns

Barbarigo was a World War II Italian Marcello-class submarine. It was built by the Cantieri Riuniti dell'Adriatico, and was commissioned on 19 September 1938.

== History ==
After early peacetime training activity, and two fruitless missions in the Mediterranean Sea, the Barbarigo was assigned to the Atlantic theater, reaching its base in Bordeaux on 8 September 1940, after an unsuccessful patrol.

From October 1940 to May 1941, she went on three missions around Irish waters, which obtained only the damaging of a merchantman. In July, she sailed to the west of the Strait of Gibraltar and obtained its first successes, sinking the British ship Macon (5135 tls) on 25 July, and then the oiler Horn Shell (8272 tls), before turning for port. On 22 October, Barbarigo sailed again, under the command of Capitano di Corvetta Enzo Grossi, but the patrol was unsuccessful. On the next patrol, the submarine met a lighted ship, but Grossi torpedoed and sank her nonetheless (it was the neutral Spanish ship SS Navemar), on 23 January 1941.

Afterwards, Barbarigo was sent to Brazilian waters, departing Bordeaux on 30 April. She was responsible for the first Brazilian war action of World War II; she attacked the Brazilian merchant ship Comandante Lyra on 18 May 1942, without sinking her, and she was chased by Brazilian aero-naval forces for five days. The submarine managed to escape two attacks by Brazilian B-25 aircraft.

On 20 May, the Barbarigo met the cruiser USS Milwaukee and the destroyer USS Moffett; wrongly recognizing the former as a Maryland-class battleship, Grossi fired two torpedoes at the cruiser. With he and his crew being convinced they had seen and felt the "battleship" being struck and sinking, Barbarigo sailed away, while the American ships had not even been aware of the attack. Grossi reported his "sinking", and, despite the doubts and misgivings of BETASOM commander Romolo Polacchini, the action was widely publicized on Italian and German press; Grossi was awarded with a Gold Medal of Military Valour and promoted to Capitano di Fregata (Commander). On its way home, Barbarigo attacked and sank the ship Charlbury (4836 tls), 28 May.

On 29 August, the submarine sailed again, this time for a mission around the African coast. On the night of 6 October, Barbarigo met the corvette HMS Petunia, and Grossi "recognized" her as a New Mexico-class battleship; he fired four torpedoes, and again he was convinced he had successfully sunk an enemy battleship, while Petunia had escaped unharmed. Barbarigo returned to port on the night of 29 October. Again, Grossi's "success" was widely reported, and he was promoted to Capitano di Vascello (Captain) and awarded a second Gold Medal; he left the submarine to replace Polacchini as BETASOM commander. After the war, Grossi's actions would be the object of two enquiries in 1949 and 1962, which concluded that he and his crew had been in good faith, but stripped him of his promotions and awards.

On 24 January 1943, the submarine departed for its last mission as an attack submarine, in which it sank the ships Monte Igueldo (3453 tls) on 24 February, Alfonso Pena (3540 tls) on 2 March, and Staghound on 3 March, before returning to Bordeaux on 3 April.

After a period of time for repairs, as well as some replacements and retraining of crew, the submarine was converted into a transport to carry materiel between Germany and Japan in 1943, with guns, torpedoes and all but one periscope being removed; it departed Bordeaux on 16 June, with 130 tons of valuable load, but disappeared. After the war, British records showed that an unidentified submarine had been attacked and presumed sunk between 17 and 19 June, in the area where Barbarigo might have been.

== See also ==
- Italian submarines of World War II
