= Italian submarine Ambra =

Italian submarine

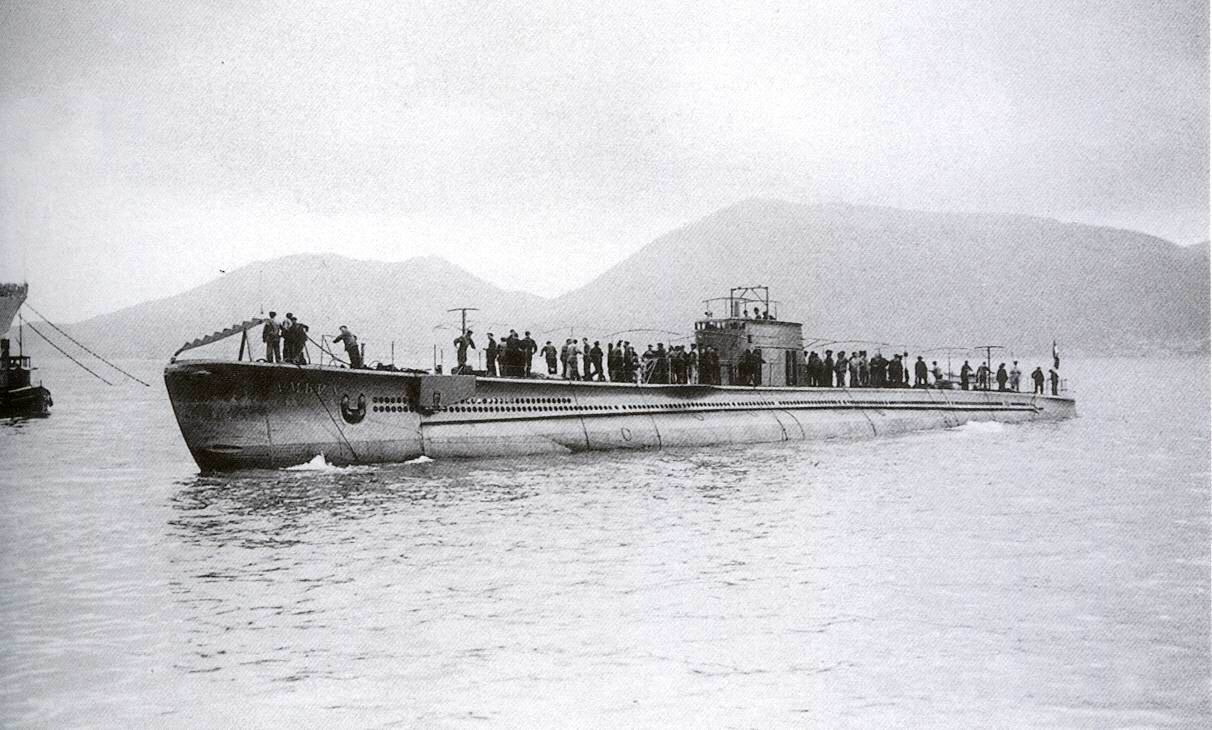
- Ambra being launched

History

Kingdom of Italy
- Name: Ambra
- Namesake: Amber
- Builder: OTO, Muggiano
- Laid down: 28 August 1935
- Launched: 28 May 1936
- Commissioned: 4 August 1936
- Fate: Sunk, 4 September 1944

General characteristics
- Class & type: Perla-class submarine
- Displacement: 622.57 tonnes (613 long tons) standard; 696.0 tonnes (685 long tons) normal (surfaced); 852.5 tonnes (839 long tons) normal (submerged)
- Length: 60.18 m (197 ft 5 in)
- Beam: 6.454 m (21 ft 2.1 in)
- Draft: 4.724 m (15 ft 6.0 in)
- Installed power: 1,200 bhp (890 kW) (diesels); 800 hp (600 kW) (electric motors)
- Propulsion: Diesel-electric; 2 × Tosi diesel engines; 2 × Marelli electric engines
- Speed: 14 knots (26 km/h; 16 mph) surfaced; 7.5 knots (13.9 km/h; 8.6 mph) submerged
- Range: 5,200 nmi (9,600 km; 6,000 mi) at 8 knots (15 km/h; 9.2 mph) surfaced; 74 nmi (137 km; 85 mi) at 4 knots (7.4 km/h; 4.6 mph) submerged
- Test depth: 80 m (260 ft)
- Complement: 44 (4 officers + 40 non-officers and sailors)
- Armament: 6 × 533 mm (21 in) torpedo tubes (4 bow, 2 stern); 1 × 100 mm (4 in) / 47 caliber deck gun; 2 x 1 – 13.2 mm (0.52 in) anti-aircraft guns

Italian submarine Ambra was a Perla-class submarine built for the Royal Italian Navy (Regia Marina) during the 1930s. She was named after the gemstone amber.

== Design and description ==
The Perla-class submarines were essentially repeats of the preceding Sirena class. The modifications that were made compared to the boats of the previous series were mostly of upgrade nature. Among them were enlargement of the false tower at the top, more modern engines, installation of a radiogoniometer that could be controlled from inside the ship. Improvements and the installation of new air conditioning equipment meant a slight increase in displacement, and increase in the fuel stowage also increased the autonomy of these boats compared to the previous series. Their designed full load displacement was 695 metric tons (684 long tons) surfaced and 855 metric tons (841 long tons) submerged, but varied somewhat depending on the boat and the builder. The submarines were 197 feet 6 inches (60.20 m) long, had a beam of 21 feet (6.4 m) and a draft of 15 feet (4.6 m) to 15 feet 5 inches (4.70 m).

For surface running, the boats were powered by two diesel engines, each driving one propeller shaft with overall power of 675–750 hp (503–559 kW). When submerged each propeller was driven by a 400-horsepower (298 kW) electric motor. They could reach 14 knots (26 km/h; 16 mph) on the surface and 7.5 knots (13.9 km/h; 8.6 mph) underwater. On the surface, the Perla class had a range of 5,200 nautical miles (9,600 km; 6,000 mi) at 8 knots (15 km/h; 9.2 mph), submerged, they had a range of 74 nmi (137 km; 85 mi) at 4 knots (7.4 km/h; 4.6 mph).

The boats were armed with six internal 53.3 cm (21.0 in) torpedo tubes, four in the bow and two in the stern. One reload torpedo was carried for each tube, for a total of twelve. They were also armed with one 100 mm (4 in) deck gun for combat on the surface. The light anti-aircraft armament consisted of one or two pairs of 13.2 mm (0.52 in) machine guns.

== Construction and career ==
Ambra was built by OTO at their shipyard in Muggiano, laid on 28 August 1935, launched on 28 May 1936 and completed on 4 August 1936.

=== Prewar (1936-1940) ===
After delivery, Ambra was assigned to the 34th Squadron (III Submarine group) based at Messina. She was commanded by captain Cesare Corrado. After a brief training, in 1937 she carried out a long endurance cruise in the Dodecanese, and the Mediterranean visiting the North African ports in Libya.

During the Spanish Civil War she was sent on a secret mission to patrol off Alicante on August 29, 1937. During the mission she attempted to attack a ship, but aborted it, failing to identify nationality of the target. She returned to base on September 6, 1937, finishing her mission.

During 1938–1940 Ambra conducted several long training patrols in the Mediterranean, especially around Tobruk.

In 1940 Ambra returned to Italy, and was assigned together with Rubino and Malachite to the 47th Squadron (IV Submarine Group) at Taranto.

=== 1940-1942 ===
In the first months of the war, Ambra was mostly employed in defensive missions in the Gulf of Taranto and patrols off Alexandria. For example, in August 1940 carried out five defensive patrols in the Gulf of Taranto.

On September 23, 1940, she was deployed south of Crete along with Serpente and Goffredo Mameli. On September 28, 1940, she attempted unsuccessfully to intercept a British convoy, part of Operation "MB5".

December 12–21, 1940, Ambra patrolled southwest of Corfu along with Antonio Sciesa with the goal of protecting traffic between Italy and Albania. In the early hours of December 16, 1940 Ambra was detected by two British anti-submarine ships. They continued hunting for twelve hours, but in the end Ambra was able to evade their attacks without taking any damage.

December 31, 1940 – January 12, 1941 Ambra was deployed on patrol in the Strait of Otranto along with Turchese and Filippo Corridoni to protect traffic between Italy and Albania.

On January 19, 1941, captain Mario Arillo was appointed the new commander of Ambra.

On March 5, 1941, she was deployed along with ten other submarines off Crete to search for British convoys on the route Alexandria to Piraeus. These convoys were a part of Operation "Lustre", an attempt by the British to bring in 58,000 men from Egypt to Greece in anticipation of the German invasion. Ambra failed to detect any enemy ships.

On March 22, 1941, Ambra together with Ascianghi and Dagabur was sent to patrol along Alexandria – Cape Krio line and arrived in her assigned area on March 24, 1941. The submarines deployed as a defensive screen for the Operation "Gaudo", an anticipated sortie by the Italian fleet into the Aegean which would end with a catastrophic Italian defeat in the Battle of Cape Matapan. On March 27, 1941, Ambra discovered that her hydrophones did not work. At 2:37 on March 31, 1941, she sighted a large escorted ship moving at an estimated speed of 10 knots. At 2:44 she launched three torpedoes at the target and remained on the surface to observe the results. Two torpedoes hit the ship in the middle, and Arillo, in the dark, assumed he had torpedoed a large tanker. The ship hit was actually British light cruiser HMS Bonaventure escorting convoy GA8 from Greece to Alexandria along with destroyers HMAS Stuart, HMS Griffin and HMS Hereward. Hit in both of her engine rooms Bonaventure quickly sank within five or six minutes in the position 33°20′N 26°35′E with 139 casualties and 310 survivors. After observing the success of her attack, Ambra moved away. While Hereward was rescuing the survivors, Stuart, who was missed by the third torpedo, detected Ambra with ASDIC and commenced a series of depth charge attacks against the submarine. Hereward soon joined in, and attacks lasted for several hours until approximately 6:30. The submarine suffered damage to a variety of her equipment, including both gyroscopic and magnetic compasses. Once the escorts moved away, Ambra surfaced and using Celestial Navigation made her way back to Augusta. Captain Arillo received the Silver Medal of Military Valor for his performance during this patrol.

On May 1, 1941, she sailed from Augusta to patrol an area outside of Alexandria. On May 5, 1941, due to a leak in one of the torpedo tubes, Commander Arillo decided to abort the mission. On May 7 Ambra returned to the base. Arillo was criticized by his superiors because they believed the failure was not severe enough to justify an early return.

During May 12–20, 1941, she patrolled southeast of Malta.

On September 23–24, 1941, she performed an anti-submarine patrol in the Strait of Messina together with Albatros.

On October 3, 1941, she left from Augusta to patrol off Cape Zebib on the news of the suspected British moves towards the Strait of Sicily. On October 4, 1941, Ambra was called back to the base since the British threat never materialized. On the way back to Messina one of her engines failed.

=== SLC Conversion ===
Following the request of Captain Junio Valerio Borghese, new commander of Decima Flottiglia MAS, Ambra was transferred to that division to be converted to an SLC (Siluro a Lunga Corsa, which means long running torpedo) submarine in addition to already operating Scirè. Captain Arillo was retained as Ambra's commander. During the conversion, three SLC units were fitted onto the boat on her deck, two placed side by side in the aft, and one on her bow, the submarine's deck gun was also removed to accommodate SLC units and the tower was modified to better adapt for the new role. With a weight of 2.8 tons, these SLC cylinders were able to withstand depths up to 90 meters.

During April 11–19, 1942, Ambra performed a training mission off the western coast of Sardinia following the completion of the conversion procedure.

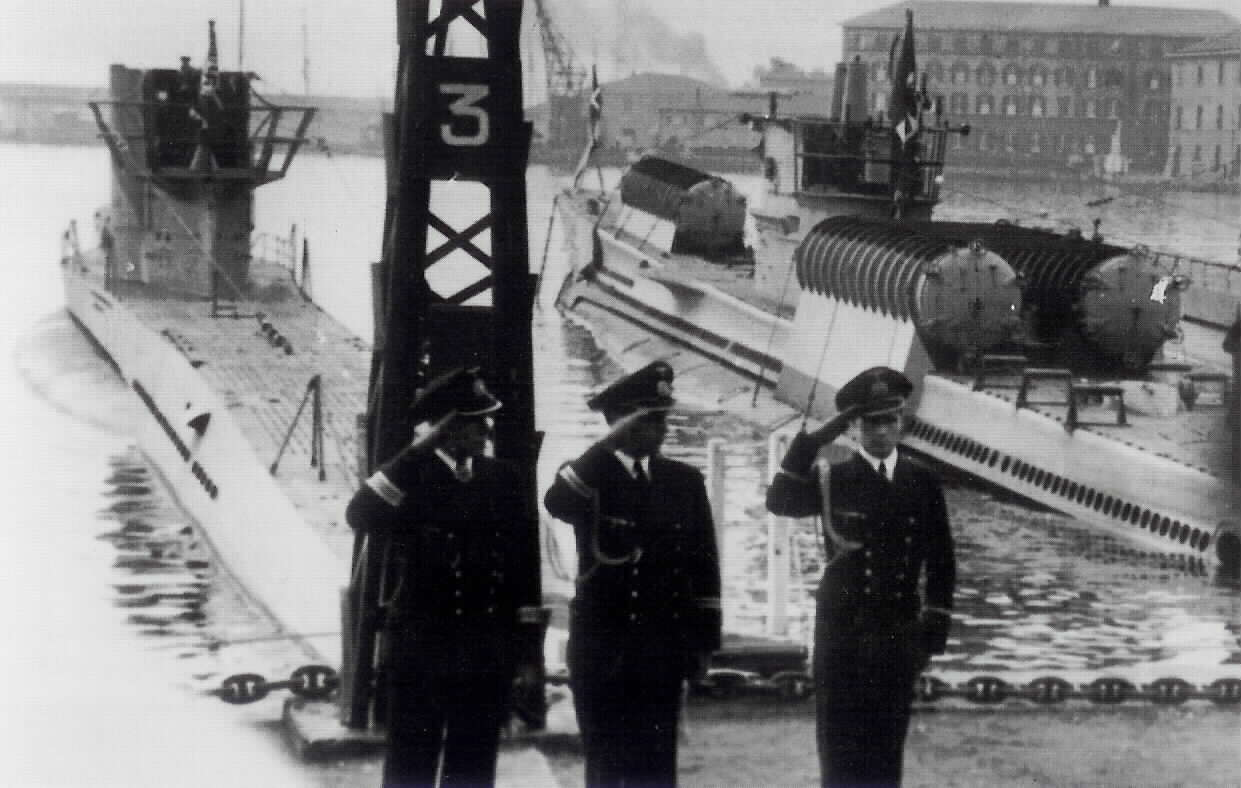
Ambra and Type VIIC in La Spezia in 1942

On April 29, 1942, Ambra left La Spezia to conduct an operation against the naval base at Alexandria. After reviewing the aerophotographs of the port of Alexandria it was realized that the British battleships HMS Valiant and HMS Queen Elizabeth were severely damaged by the SLC attack on December 18, but not sunk. It was therefore decided to launch a new SLC attack against Alexandria: the designated targets were HMS Queen Elizabeth and the submarine depot ship HMS Medway.

On May 5, 1942, Ambra arrived at Leros and embarked SLC and their crews. On May 9 (or 12) 1942 Ambra left Leros to her designated area where she arrived in the evening of May 14, 1942, in view of Alexandria's harbor. At 20:50 three SLCs were released and headed for the port. However, due to existing currents, Ambra drifted while the preparation were under way, and released SLC units in the wrong place. As a result, SLC units wandered along the coast looking for port access, and couldn't locate it. Running out of fuel or due to malfunctions, all three SLC units sank, and the mission was a complete failure. Meanwhile, at 21:05 Ambra left the area and headed back to the base. On May 24, 1942, she reached La Spezia. This was the last operation against Alexandria not only because of the failure, but also because following the Italian-German advance in Egypt, most Mediterranean Fleet ships were transferred to Palestine or to the Red Sea.

Following defeat in the Second Battle of El Alamein and Operation Torch, the German-Italian position in North Africa became untenable. With Algeria switching sides from Vichy to Free France side, Allies gain a valuable port in Algiers. Decima Flottiglia MAS was ordered to organize a raid on the harbor of Algiers since it was teeming with all possible kind of vessels.

Ambra sailed from La Spezia in the early afternoon of December 4, 1942. She reached the coast of Algeria in the evening of December 7, but adverse weather conditions forced her to remain inactive for several days. Finally, on December 11 the weather improved and Ambra started approaching Algiers. Due to strong aircraft presence, an approach had to be made at a great depth. Captain Arillo managed to penetrate the harbor by moving close to the bottom, and at 19:40 he reached the harbor at the depth of 18 meters. However, upon examining the surroundings no ships were spotted, and Ambra was forced to resume her approach continuing crawling on the bottom of the bay. Eventually, at 21:45, the submarine arrived near the coast and stopped in the middle of a group of six merchant ships. In view of the delay, it was decided to send SLC units against them. Between 22:50 and 23:20 units were sent out, charges were loaded and they all went off as expected. SS Ocean Vanquisher (7174 GRT) SS Berto (1493 GRT) were sunk, while SS Empire Centaur (7041 GRT) and SS Harmattan (4558 GRT) were seriously damaged. At 2:54, Arillo decided to leave before his submarine was found and destroyed. Ambra again had to crawl out of the harbor and she finally managed to reach the open sea. She surfaced at 19:45 on December 12, after spending 36 hours under water. After three more days at sea, she arrived in La Spezia on December 15. For the operation in Algiers commander Arillo was awarded the Gold Medal of Military Valor.

In March 1943 while stationed in La Spezia, Ambra was damaged by an overnight air raid.

After the start of Allied invasion of Sicily on July 10, 1943 Ambra was assigned her last task. She was to enter the harbor of Siracusa and destroy as many ships as possible. The submarine had a new commander, as captain Renato Ferrini, a former commander of Axum was appointed prior to the mission. On July 14, 1943, Ambra departed from La Spezia and at night of July 17 arrived close to the Sicilian port. However, after the submarine surfaced at 3:20 on July 18 in the position 37°20′N 16°15′E, Ambra was detected by a British Vickers Wellington bomber of the No. 221 Squadron RAF, piloted by Petty Officer Austin. The Wellington went on the attack, dropping six depth charges. Ambra was not hit directly, but several near misses caused extensive damage. Ambra remained immobilized for half an hour, then the crew succeeded in starting her diesel engines and the submarine started her trip back to Messina where she arrived on July 19. From there she was towed by torpedo boat Partenope to Naples. After temporary repairs in Naples Ambra went to La Spezia, where she arrived on July 27.

The submarine spent the next month and a half undergoing repair work, which was not finished when the Armistice was announced on September 8, 1943. Ambra was scuttled in La Spezia on September 9, 1943. Later refloated by the Germans she was again sunk in Genoa during an air raid by 144 B-17 Flying Fortresses of the 449th and 450th Group of the 15th Air Force on September 4, 1944.
