= Italian submarine Glauco (1905) =

Glauco class submarine for the Royal Italian Navy

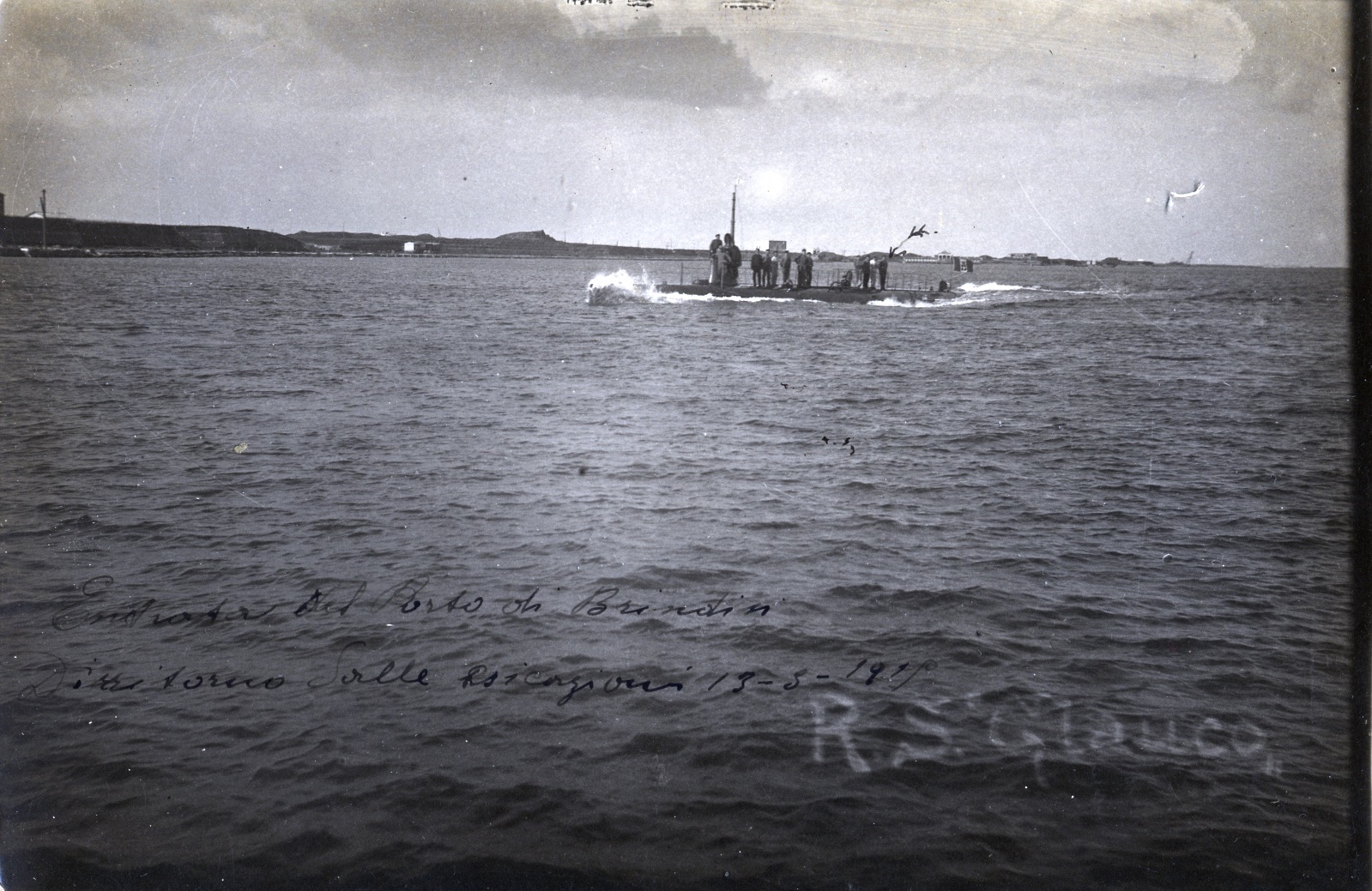
- Italian submarine Glauco at Brindisi in March 1919

History

Italy
- Name: Glauco
- Builder: Regio Arsenale, Venice
- Laid down: 1 July 1903
- Launched: 9 July 1905
- Completed: 15 December 1905
- In service: 15 December 1905
- Out of service: 1 September 1916
- Motto: (Latin): Gloria audaciae comes ("Glory is fellow with bravery")
- Fate: Stricken 1 September 1916

General characteristics
- Class & type: Glauco-class submarine
- Displacement: 160 t (157 long tons) (surfaced); 243 t (239 long tons) (submerged)
- Length: 36.8 m (121 ft)
- Beam: 4.32 m (14 ft 2 in)
- Draft: 2.5 m (8 ft)
- Installed power: 600 bhp (450 kW) (diesels); 170 bhp (130 kW) (electric motors)
- Propulsion: 2 shafts; diesel-electric; 2 × diesel engines; 2 × electric motors
- Speed: 13 knots (24 km/h; 15 mph) (surfaced); 6.2 knots (11.5 km/h; 7.1 mph) (submerged)
- Range: 150 nmi (280 km; 170 mi) at 13 knots (24 km/h; 15 mph) (surfaced); 18 nmi (33 km; 21 mi) at 6 knots (11 km/h; 6.9 mph) (submerged)
- Test depth: 25 m (82 ft)
- Complement: 15
- Armament: 3 × 450 mm (18 in) torpedo tubes (3 bow)

Glauco was one of five Glauco-class submarines built for the Regia Marina (Royal Italian Navy) during the early 1900s. The boat served in World War I and ceased service in 1916.

== Design ==
The Glauco class of small submarines, designed by Cesare Laurenti, was the first class of submarines to be built for the Italian Navy, following the 1890 experimental submarine Delfino. They were 36.84 m (120 ft 10 in) long, with a beam of 4.32 m (14 ft 2 in) and a draft of 2.66 m (8 ft 9 in). The submarines of the class displaced 157–161 t (155–158 long tons) on the surface and 240–244 t (236–240 long tons) submerged. Glauco was powered by two Fiat petrol engines on the surface, rated at 600 bhp (450 kW) and two electric motors rated at 170 hp (130 kW) while submerged, giving a speed of 13 knots (24 km/h; 15 mph) on the surface and 6 knots (11 km/h; 6.9 mph) underwater. Range was 900 nautical miles (1,700 km; 1,000 mi) at 8 knots (15 km/h; 9.2 mph) on the surface and 40 nautical miles (74 km; 46 mi) at 4 knots (7.4 km/h; 4.6 mph).

Glauco was armed with three 450 mm (17.7 in) torpedo tubes. This differed from the remaining submarines of the class, which were only fitted with two torpedo tubes. The submarine's crew was 2 officers and 13 other ranks.

== Construction and career ==
Glauco was laid down on 1 July 1903 at the Regio Arsenale (the Navy shipyard) at Venice, was launched on 9 July 1905 and was completed on 15 December that year. Glauco entered in service in December as a training ship in the Adriatic Sea. The Glaucos were still largely experimental submarines, and were known as Benzinari (petrol burners) owing to their power plants.

In August 1914 the submarine was assigned to the 4th Submarine Division based in Venice and was commanded by Lieutenant P. Tolosetto Farinata degli Uberti. On 24 May 1915, when Italy entered the First World War, Glauco, still part of the 4th Submarine Division, was based at Brindisi.

In 1916 Glauco was first deployed to Taranto, forming a separate unit combined with sister submarine Otaria and later in May was based in Valona in Albania.

In August of the same year the submarine was disarmed and deployed in Taranto until 1921, when she was eventually sold to Romanian Maritime Lloyd.

Throughout the war, the Glauco had carried out a total of 65 defensive missions in the sea between Bari, Barletta and Valona, for a total of 296 hours of surface navigation and 252 submerged.

== Bibliography ==
- Favre, Franco (2008). La Marina nella Grande Guerra. Le operazioni aeree, navali, subacquee e terrestri in Adriatico (in Italian). Gaspari Editore. ISBN 978-88-7541-135-0.
- Fraccaroli, Aldo (1970). Italian Warships of World War II. London: Ian Allan. ISBN 0-7110-0105-7.
- Gardiner, Robert; Gray, Randal, eds. (1985). Conway's All The World's Fighting Ships 1906–1921. London: Conway Maritime Press. ISBN 0-85177-245-5.
