= Romolo Polacchini =

Italian admiral

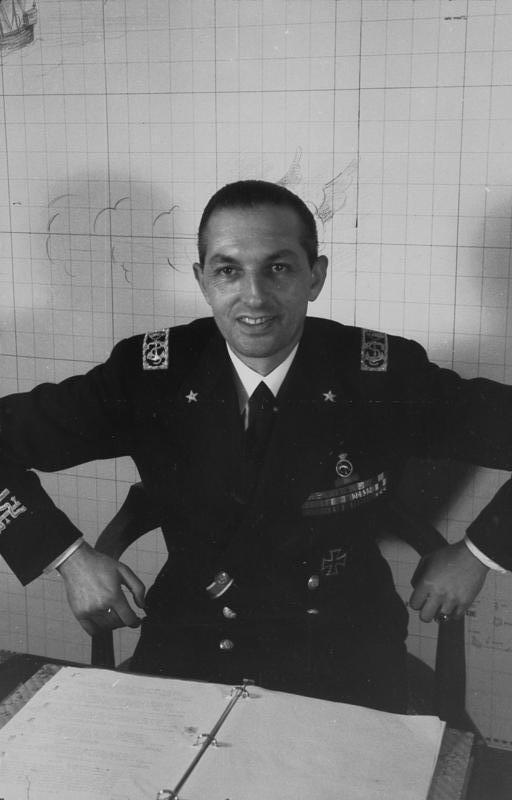
- Admiral Polacchini in Bordeaux in 1942.
- Born: 20 May 1897; La Spezia, Ligury, Kingdom of Italy
- Died: 16 October 1968 (aged 71); Venice, Veneto, Italy
- Military career
- Allegiance: Kingdom of Italy
- Branch: Regia Marina
- Service years: 1911–1958
- Rank: Ammiraglio (Admiral)
- Commands: N 3 (submarine); H 1 (submarine); 69 PN (torpedo boat); X 2 (submarine); F 19 (submarine); Tito Speri (submarine); Argonauta (submarine); Otaria (submarine); Taranto Submarine Group; X 2 (submarine); Des Geneys (submarine); Santorre Santarosa (submarine); Venice Naval Base; Luigi Cadorna (light cruiser); Naval Command for Traffic with Albania; Pola Submarine School; BETASOM; Palermo Naval Command; Livorno Naval Command
- Conflicts: World War I; Adriatic Campaign; Spanish Civil War; World War II; Battle of the Mediterranean; Battle of Calabria; Battle of the Atlantic; Operation Achse
- Awards: Silver Medal of Military Valor; War Cross for Military Valor (twice); War Merit Cross (six times); Military Order of Savoy; Iron Cross first class; Iron Cross second class; Cross of Military Merit (Spain)

Romolo Polacchini (20 May 1897 – 16 October 1968) was an Italian admiral during World War II.

== Early life and career ==
Romolo Polacchini was born in La Spezia in 1897 and attended the Italian Naval Academy in Livorno from 6 November 1911 to 7 June 1914, graduating as an ensign. His first assignment was on the protected cruiser Etna; he then served on the battleships Dante Alighieri and Andrea Doria during World War I, receiving his first a War Merit Cross. In 1918, with the rank of sub-lieutenant, he became the executive officer of the submarine H 3, taking part in some missions in the Adriatic Sea. He remained in the submarine branch after the war; in 1923 he received his first command, the submarine N 3. In 1924 he was assigned for a year to the La Maddalena naval base; then, as a lieutenant, he was the commanding officer of the submarine H 1 and then (for four months) of the coastal torpedo boat 69 PN. In the following year, after promotion to lieutenant commander, he was given command of the minelaying submarine X 2; in 1929 he commanded the submarine F 19.

Between 1930 and 1931 Polacchini was the commanding officer of the submarine Tito Speri; in 1931 he was awarded the title of Officer of the Order of Ismail by the King of Egypt Fuad I, and in 1932 he was promoted to commander. For some time he was given shore assignments in the Taranto Naval Department and the Castellammare di Stabia Naval Command. In 1933 he served as deputy chief of staff on the light cruiser Alberto di Giussano and then on its sistership Giovanni delle Bande Nere. He then commanded the submarines Argonauta, Otaria and the Taranto Submarine Group, after which he participated in some clandestine missions during the Spanish Civil War in command of the submarines Des Geneys and Santorre Santarosa. In 1936 he was promoted to captain and appointed commander of the Venice Naval Base.

== World War II and later years ==
In 1940 Polacchini was given command of the light cruiser Luigi Cadorna, and in this role he participated in the Battle of Calabria after Italy entered World War II. For his behaviour in the battle, he was awarded a War Cross for Military Valor. He was then made commander of the High Command for the Traffic with Albania (Maritrafalba, with headquarters in Brindisi) during the Greco-Italian War, after which he was given command of the Submarine School in Pola.

On 15 April 1941 Polacchini became chief of staff of the Italian BETASOM Atlantic submarine base in Bordeaux, replacing Captain Aldo Cocchia. After promotion to rear admiral, on 18 September 1941, he replaced Vice Admiral Angelo Parona as the commanding officer of BETASOM. During Polacchini's command, BETASOM submarines saw the peak in their activity, successfully participating in Operation Neuland and obtaining their greatest successes. During this period, Polacchini was awarded the Knight's Cross of the Military Order of Savoy by Italy, and the Iron Cross first class and second class by Germany.

Probably as a result of his vocal skepticism concerning the claimed sinking of two American battleships by submarine commander Enzo Grossi, on 29 December 1942 Polacchini was called back to Italy, with Grossi replacing him as the commander of BETASOM. In January 1943 Polacchini was given command of the Palermo Naval Command; he participated in the organization of supply convoys to North Africa during the Tunisian campaign, receiving a Silver Medal of Military Valor for his efforts while Palermo was subjected to heavy Allied bombings.

In June 1943 Polacchini was appointed commander of the Livorno Naval Command. After the armistice of Cassibile, when German troops enacting Operation Achse approached Livorno, he gave orders for resistance against any German offensive action; then, as the German forces were preponderant and his men inadequately armed (there were about 200 rifles for a garrison of 1,000 men, and many of them lacked ammunition), he ordered his men to save themselves. He also ordered some coastal batteries to open fire on German vessels that were attacking the auxiliary cruiser Piero Foscari and the steamer Valverde, in order to help them. He narrowly escaped capture by a German motorized unit sent to his house, and then took refuge in the house of friends in Castiglioncello for some time, before joining his family in Venice in January 1944.

In May 1944, in order to avoid being deported to Germany, Polacchini took a formal oath to the Italian Social Republic, but at the same time he began to work secretly with the Northern Italy National Liberation Committee. On 8 August 1944 he was arrested by the fascists and imprisoned in Venice with accusations of "subversive activities against Fascism" and "intelligence with the enemy". He remained in prison for five months; after the intercession of Cardinal Giovanni Urbani, the future Patriarch of Venice and uncle to his brother's wife, he was released with the obligation of signing to the police station every evening. At the end of war in Italy, with the fall of the fascism, on 6 May 1945 he assumed command of the Navy services in Venice, but he was placed in the reserve on 20 February 1946. On 5 May that year he was promoted to vice admiral.

On 19 February 1950, having contracted serious illness to the lungs during the period spent in prison, he was forced to leave the service on health grounds and was placed in an absolute discharge and enrolled to the Roll of Honor of the Navy. He was promoted to full admiral on 27 June 1958. He then retired to live in Venice Lido, where he died in 1968.
