= Glauco (footballer, born 1995) =

Brazilian footballer (born 1995)

Personal information
- Full name: Glauco Tadeu Passos Chaves
- Date of birth: 11 February 1995 (age 31)
- Place of birth: Belo Horizonte, Brazil
- Height: 1.91 m (6 ft 3 in)
- Position: Goalkeeper

Team information
- Current team: Joinville

Youth career
- América

Senior career*
Years	Team	Apps	(Gls)
2013–2019	América	1	(0)
2014	→ Ipatinga (loan)	0	(0)
2019–2021	Oeste	15	(0)
2021–2023	Ituano	1	(0)
2023–	Joinville	11	(0)
2023	Athletic	17	(0)
Medal record
América
Runner-up	Campeonato Mineiro	2016
Winner	Série B	2017
- * Club domestic league appearances and goals as of 22:55, 1 December 2023 (UTC)

Glauco Tadeu Passos Chaves (born 11 February 1995), commonly known as Glauco, is a Brazilian footballer who currently plays as a goalkeeper for Joinville.

== Career statistics ==
=== Club ===
As of 5 July 2019.

Club	Season	League			State League		Cup		Other		Total	
Club	Season	Division	Apps	Goals	Apps	Goals	Apps	Goals	Apps	Goals	Apps	Goals
América	2013	Série B	0	0	0	0	0	0	0	0	0	0
América	2014	Série B	0	0	0	0	0	0	0	0	0	0
América	2015	Série B	0	0	0	0	0	0	0	0	0	0
América	2016	Série A	1	0	0	0	0	0	0	0	1	0
América	2017	Série B	0	0	0	0	0	0	0	0	0	0
América	2018	Série A	0	0	5 (Note: Appearances in the Campeonato Mineiro)	0	0	0	0	0	5	0
América	2019	Série B	0	0	1	0	0	0	0	0	1	0
América	Total		1	0	6	0	0	0	0	0	7	0
Oeste	2019	Série B	2	0	0	0	0	0	0	0	2	0
Career total			3	0	6	0	0	0	0	0	9	0
