= Italian submarine Otaria (1908) =

Glauco class submarine of the Royal Italian Navy

History

Italy
- Name: Otaria
- Namesake: Otary
- Builder: Regio Arsenale, Venice
- Laid down: 10 May 1905
- Launched: 25 March 1908
- Completed: 1 July 1908
- Fate: Stricken 26 September 1918

General characteristics
- Class & type: Glauco-class submarine
- Displacement: 160 t (157 long tons) (surfaced); 243 t (239 long tons) (submerged)
- Length: 36.8 m (121 ft)
- Beam: 4.32 m (14 ft 2 in)
- Draft: 2.5 m (8 ft)
- Installed power: 600 bhp (450 kW) (diesels); 170 bhp (130 kW) (electric motors)
- Propulsion: 2 shafts; diesel-electric; 2 × diesel engines; 2 × electric motors
- Speed: 13 knots (24 km/h; 15 mph) (surfaced); 6.2 knots (11.5 km/h; 7.1 mph) (submerged)
- Range: 150 nmi (280 km; 170 mi) at 13 knots (24 km/h; 15 mph) (surfaced); 18 nmi (33 km; 21 mi) at 6 knots (11 km/h; 6.9 mph) (submerged)
- Test depth: 25 m (82 ft)
- Complement: 15
- Armament: 3 × 450 mm (18 in) torpedo tubes (3 bow)

Otaria was one of five Glauco-class submarines built for the Regia Marina (Royal Italian Navy) during the early 1900s. The boat served in World War I and ceased service in 1918.

== Construction and career ==
Otaria was laid down on 10 May 1905 at the Regio Arsenale at Venice, launched on 25 March 1908 and completed on 1 July 1908. She was employed as a training ship in the Tyrrhenian Sea.

After an intensive training, in August 1914 the submarine was assigned to the 4th submarines squadron based in Venice and put under the command of Lieutenant Emanuele Ponzio. At the start of the First World War for Italy the ship was re-assigned to the 1st submarines squadron based in the Adriatic Sea and was employed as a defensive unit in the Gulf of Venice.

In June 1916 Otaria was deployed in Taranto, forming a separate unit combined with the twin submarine Glauco and later in January 1917 she was transferred again in Venice and assigned to the 2nd submarines squadron.

In December of the same year the submarine was transferred in Porto Corsini and later in 1918 disarmed and demolished.

Throughout the war, the Otaria had carried out a total of 46 defensive missions.

== Bibliography ==
- Favre, Franco (2008). La Marina nella Grande Guerra. Le operazioni aeree, navali, subacquee e terrestri in Adriatico (in Italian). Gaspari Editore. ISBN 978-88-7541-135-0.
