= Italian submarine Velella (1936) =

Italian submarine

History

Kingdom of Italy
- Name: Velella
- Builder: Cantieri Riuniti dell'Adriatico, Monfalcone
- Launched: 12 December 1936
- Fate: Sunk by HMS Shakespeare, 7 September 1943

General characteristics
- Class & type: Argo-class submarine
- Displacement: 793 t (780 long tons) (surfaced); 1,016 t (1,000 long tons) (submerged)
- Length: 63.15 m (207 ft 2 in)
- Beam: 6.93 m (22 ft 9 in)
- Draft: 4.46 m (14 ft 8 in)
- Installed power: 1,500 bhp (1,100 kW) (diesels); 800 hp (600 kW) (electric motors)
- Propulsion: 2 shafts; diesel-electric; 2 × diesel engines; 2 × electric motors
- Speed: 14 knots (26 km/h; 16 mph) (surfaced); 8 knots (15 km/h; 9.2 mph) (submerged)
- Range: 10,176 nmi (18,846 km; 11,710 mi) at 8.5 knots (15.7 km/h; 9.8 mph) (surfaced); 100 nmi (190 km; 120 mi) at 3 knots (5.6 km/h; 3.5 mph) (submerged)
- Test depth: 90 m (300 ft)
- Armament: 1 × single 100 mm (3.9 in) deck gun; 4 × single 13.2 mm (0.52 in) machine guns; 6 × 533 mm (21 in) torpedo tubes (4 bow, 2 stern)

Velella was one of a pair of submarines ordered by the Portuguese government, but taken over and completed for the Regia Marina (Royal Italian Navy) during the 1930s.

== Design and description ==
The Argo-class submarines displaced 793 metric tons (780 long tons) surfaced and 1,016 metric tons (1,000 long tons) submerged. The submarines were 63.15 meters (207 ft 2 in) long, had a beam of 6.93 meters (22 ft 9 in) and a draft of 4.46 meters (14 ft 8 in). They had an operational diving depth of 90 meters (300 ft). Their crew numbered 46 officers and enlisted men.

For surface running, the boats were powered by two 750-brake-horsepower (559 kW) diesel engines, each driving one propeller shaft. When submerged each propeller was driven by a 400-horsepower (298 kW) electric motor. They could reach 14 knots (26 km/h; 16 mph) on the surface and 8 knots (15 km/h; 9.2 mph) underwater. On the surface, the Argo class had a range of 10,176 nautical miles (18,846 km; 11,710 mi) at 8 knots (15 km/h; 9.2 mph); submerged, they had a range of 100 nmi (190 km; 120 mi) at 3 knots (5.6 km/h; 3.5 mph).

The boats were armed with six internal 53.3-centimeter (21 in) torpedo tubes, four in the bow and two in the stern for which they carried a total of 10 torpedoes. They were also armed with a single 100-millimeter (3.9 in) deck gun, forward of the conning tower, for combat on the surface. The light anti-aircraft armament consisted of four single 13.2-millimeter (0.52 in) machine guns.

== Service ==
Velella was built by Cantieri Riuniti dell'Adriatico in its Monfalcone shipyard. The submarine had initially been ordered in 1931, but was acquired by the Italians when Portugal cancelled the order. She was launched in 1936, and saw action in the Second World War. The submarine was sunk by the British ship HMS Shakespeare on 7 September 1943, with the loss of all crew.
