= Vladimiro Pini =

Italian politician

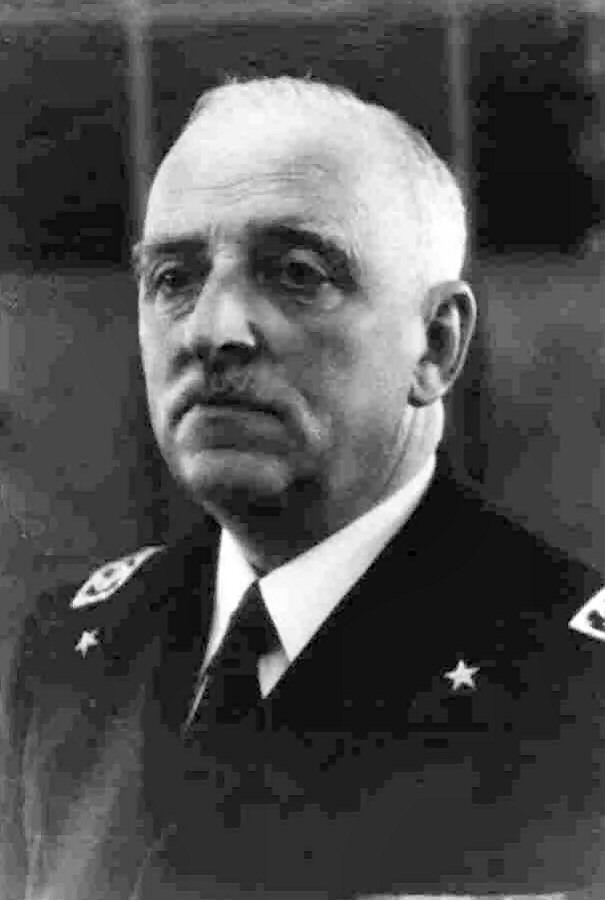
- Born: 12 August 1879; Livorno, Kingdom of Italy
- Died: 19 January 1959 (aged 79); Livorno, Italy
- Military career
- Allegiance: Kingdom of Italy
- Branch: Regia Marina
- Rank: Admiral
- Commands: 11 PN (torpedo boat Tocra (auxiliary cruiser); Ardente (destroyer); Carlo Mirabello (flotilla leader); Alessandro Poerio (flotilla leader); Trento (heavy cruiser); 3rd Cruiser Division; Arsenal of La Spezia; 2nd Fleet; Naples Naval Department
- Conflicts: Boxer Rebellion; Italo-Turkish War; World War I; Adriatic campaign; Second Italo-Ethiopian War; Spanish Civil War; World War II
- Awards: Silver Medal of Military Valor; Bronze Medal of Military Valor (twice); War Merit Cross; Military Order of Savoy; Order of Saints Maurice and Lazarus; Colonial Order of the Star of Italy; Maurician Medal; Order of the German Eagle

Vladimiro Costantino Pini (Livorno, 12 August 1879 – 19 January 1959) was an Italian admiral during World War II.

== Biography ==
He entered the Naval Academy of Livorno in 1896 and graduated with the rank of ensign on 1 January 1900; as a cadet he had already served on the armoured cruiser San Giorgio since 20 July 1897. Shortly after graduation, he was a member of the Italian expeditionary force sent to China in 1900 to suppress the Boxer Rebellion; in July 1901 he was promoted to sub-lieutenant. From 1900 to 1902 he served on board the battleship Sicilia, and from 1903 to 1904 on the armoured cruiser Vettor Pisani, stationed in the Far East.

In August 1907 he was promoted to lieutenant, and in 1908 he participated in the rescue operations following the Messina earthquake, earning a bronze medal. From 1909 to 1911 he served as fire control officer on the battleships Vittorio Emanuele and Sardegna. In 1911-1912 he participated in the Italo-Turkish War on board the armoured cruiser Etna.

After the outbreak of World War I, he was given command of the torpedo boat 11 PN and later of the armed merchant cruiser Tocra. After promotion to lieutenant commander in May 1917, he was given command of the destroyer Ardente, and in 1918 he was awarded a Bronze Medal of Military Valor. After the end of the war he was a member of the Allied control commission in Berlin (1919-1920); in September 1920 he was promoted to commander, being then given command of the flotilla leaders Carlo Mirabello (which he commanded on a trip to Northern Europe in 1924, being the first European warship to enter Leningrad after the Russian Revolution) and Alessandro Poerio. In November 1926 he was promoted to captain and from 1928 to 1930 he was the commanding officer of the heavy cruiser Trento, carrying out a cruise to South America.

He was part of the Italian Navy delegation at the conference that resulted in the signing of the London Naval Treaty in 1930; in the same period he also served as chief of staff of the 1st Fleet and as chief of staff of the Minister of the Navy. An expert in international affairs, he also participated in the second London naval conference. On 19 November 1932 he was promoted to rear admiral and subsequently appointed Deputy Chief of Staff of the Navy as well as member of the Colonial High Council. On 29 August 1934 he was promoted to vice admiral and given command of the 3rd Cruiser Division; in 1934-1935 he commanded the Arsenal of La Spezia, and from 1935 to 1938 he served again as naval deputy chief of staff, organizing and supervising naval services during the Second Italo-Ethiopian War. On 1 January 1936 he was promoted to admiral, and in 1938 he was given command of the 2nd Fleet and participated in naval operations supporting the Francoist forces during the Spanish Civil War. He also held the post as head of the Operations Department at the Ministry of the Navy.

In 1939 he became a member of the Italian Senate, and in the same year he was appointed commander of the Naples Naval Department, which he held until June 1943. He then became head of the awards committee at the Ministry of the Navy in Rome; after the Armistice of Cassibile he remained in German-controlled territory but refused to collaborate, and after the liberation of Rome he resumed service in the Navy. From 1944 to 1949 he was member of various inquiry commissions and president of the commission tasked with investigating officers who had collaborated with the Italian Social Republic during the German occupation.

He retired from active service in 1949. A fluent speaker of both English and German, he translated into Italian twelve books about naval war during World War I, one about World War II and one about the Russo-Japanese War, and was himself the author of several books about naval matters. He died in his native Livorno in 1959.
