= Pelican (disambiguation) =

A pelican is a bird of the family Pelecanidae.

Pelican may also refer to:

== Places ==
=== Australia ===
- Pelican, New South Wales, a suburb of the city of Lake Macquarie
- Pelican, Queensland, a locality
- Pelican Lagoon, South Australia
- Pelican Point (Swan River), Western Australia

=== United States ===
- Pelican, Alaska, a city
- Pelican State Beach, California
- Pelican, Louisiana, an unincorporated community
- Pelican Township, Crow Wing County, Minnesota
- Pelican Township, Otter Tail County, Minnesota
- Pelican Butte, a dormant volcano in Oregon
- Pelican, Wisconsin, a town
- Pelican River (disambiguation)

=== Elsewhere ===
- Pelican Creek (Bahamas)

== Ships ==
- HMS Pelican, many British Royal Navy ships
- USS Pelican, several United States Navy ships
- USFS Pelican, a US government research vessel, later the fishery patrol vessel US FWS Pelican
- Golden Hind or Pelican, Francis Drake's ship
- Pelican (1793 ship), a British privateer which sank in 1793
- French ship Pélican (1693), a short-lived ship that won the Battle of Hudson's Bay
  - Le Pélican (1992), a replica of Pélican built in Quebec and moored at Donaldsonville, Louisiana
- French ship Pélican (1702), delivered pioneer women and yellow fever to Mobile in 1704
- RV Pelican, an oceanographic research vessel
- FV Pelican, a fishing boat which capsized in 1951 off Montauk, New York
- Pelican (dinghy), a small sail boat class in Perth, Australia
- Pelican of London, formerly Pelican (1948), sail training ship
- Pelican (Bill Short), one of a series of boats designed by Captain Bill Short
- Pelican (HBC vessel), operated by the Hudson's Bay Company from 1901–1920, see Hudson's Bay Company vessels

== Aviation ==
- Boeing Pelican, a large-capacity, low-altitude transport aircraft currently being studied
- Sikorsky HH-3F Pelican, a US Coast Guard search and rescue helicopter
- Doman LZ-2A Pelican, a five-seat helicopter first flown in 1949
- Pilatus SB-2, a Swiss civil utility aircraft
- Ultravia Pelican, two series of ultralight aircraft
- Air Est JCD 03 Pelican, a motor glider
- Pelican (bomb), a World War II radar-guided bomb developed by the US Navy
- Pelican FP-7, a Ukrainian ballistic missile
- Pelican Air Services, South African airline
- Pelican, callsign of Australian airline Aeropelican

== Music ==
- The Pelicans, Detroit doowop group produced by Al Benson in Chicago in 1953
- Pelican (band), a post-metal band from Chicago
  - Pelican (EP), their self-titled EP
- Pelican, an EP by Tracer AMC
- "Pelican" (song), a 2011 song by The Maccabees
- "Pelican", a 2015 song by David Guetta on the re-release of Listen

== Print ==
- Pelican (magazine), the University of Western Australia student newspaper
- Pelican Books, a non-fiction imprint of Penguin Books
- Pelican Publishing Company
- Les Pelican, a 1921 novel by Raymond Radiguet
- The Pelican, a 1907 play by August Strindberg

== Sports ==
- New Orleans Pelicans, a National Basketball Association team (formerly the Hornets)
- St. Petersburg Pelicans, two defunct baseball teams
- Myrtle Beach Pelicans, a minor league baseball team
- New Iberia Pelicans, a defunct minor league baseball team
- Pensacola Pelicans, a defunct minor league baseball team
- Lahti Pelicans, a Finnish ice-hockey team in the national elite league Liiga
- AS Pélican, a Gabonese football club
- Pelican Stadium, a former stadium in New Orleans

== Other uses ==
- Pelican (Fabergé egg), a jewelled Easter egg
- The Pelican (film), a 1973 French film
- Pelican crossing, a type of pedestrian road crossing
- Pelican (train), a train of the Southern Railway which ran between New York City to New Orleans
- Pelican Nebula, an HII region located toward the constellation Cygnus
- Pelican Products, a producer of cases and flashlights
- RAAF Squadron Berlin Air Lift or Operation Pelican, the Australian contribution to the Berlin Air Lift
- The Pelican, former name of the Prospect of Whitby pub in London

== See also ==
- Pelican Drop, a former New Year's Eve celebration in Pensacola, Florida
- Pelican eel, a deep sea species of fish
- Pelican Island (disambiguation)
- Pelican Lake (disambiguation)
- Pelican Portrait, of Elizabeth I of England
- Pelican Point (disambiguation)
- Pelicanman, a 2004 Finnish fantasy film
- Pelikan (disambiguation)
- The Pelican Brief, a legal-suspense thriller by John Grisham (1992)
- The Pelican Brief (film), 1993
