= Pelikan (disambiguation) =

Pelikan is a German manufacturer of fine writing instruments.

Pelikan or Pelikán may also refer to:

- Pelikán/Pelikan, a surname
- Operation Pelikan, a German plan for crippling the Panama Canal during World War II
- Pelikan Island, Palmer Archipelago, Antarctica
- Pelikan Rock, Sint Maarten, an islet in Dutch Caribbean
- Pelikan, Greater Poland Voivodeship, a village in Poland
- MV Pelikan, a German refrigerated cargo ship
- Politechnika Warszawska PW-4 Pelikan, a motor-glider
- Pelikan (organization), a group in Turkey
- Pelikan tail, an experimental tail design for fighter jets
- Pelikan Łowicz, a Polish football club
- FK Pelikán Děčín, a Czech football club
- Pelikán má alibi, a 1940 Czechoslovak film
- TAI Pelikan, a radio-controlled reconnaissance, surveillance and target acquisition drone
- Uetz Pelikan, a Swiss four-seat cabin monoplane

== See also ==
- Pelican (disambiguation)
