= Pelican Point =

Pelican Point may refer to:

== Australia ==
=== South Australia ===
- Pelican Point, Adelaide, a headland
  - Pelican Point Power Station, a power station
- Pelican Point, South Australia, a locality

=== Western Australia ===
- Pelican Point, Western Australia, a suburb of Bunbury
- Pelican Point (Swan River)
- Pelican Point (Houtman Abrolhos), on West Wallabi Island

== Canada ==
- Pelican Point, Alberta, a hamlet in Alberta
- Pelican Point, Saskatchewan, a hamlet on Murray Lake in Saskatchewan
- Pelican Pointe, a village on Last Mountain Lake in Saskatchewan

== United States ==
- Pelican Point (Utah), a location on the shore of Utah Lake, Utah County, Utah

== Namibia ==
- Pelican Point peninsula, a long sandbar guarding Walvis Bay

== See also ==
- Pelican (disambiguation)
- Pelican Island (disambiguation)
- Pelican Lake (disambiguation)
