= Neptune Lake =

Lake in Wisconsin, United States

- Location within Wisconsin Location within the United States
- Location: Oneida County, Wisconsin
- Coordinates: 45°35′23″N 089°10′25″W
- Type: Drainage
- Basin countries: United States
- Surface area: 126 acres (0.51 km^{2})
- Max. depth: 7 ft (2.1 m)
- Surface elevation: 1,604 ft (489 m)

Neptune Lake (also called Lake Ogemaga or Bug Lake or Bass Lake) is a shallow mesotrophic rural lake in Oneida County in northern Wisconsin in the United States, near the intersection of U.S. Route 45 and U.S. Route 8, about 5 miles (8.0 km) north of Pelican Lake and 1 mile (1.6 km) northwest of the small settlement of Monico. Two smaller lakes, Mars Lake and Venus Lake, are nearby.

Neptune Lake is 127 acres (0.51 km^{2}) in area with a maximum depth of 7 feet (2.1 m). Neptune Lake is used for fishing, particularly panfish, with extant species including Largemouth Bass and Northern Pike, and Bluegill.
