= Mars Lake =

Lake in Wisconsin, United States

- Location within Wisconsin Location within the United States
- Location: Oneida County, Wisconsin
- Coordinates: 45°34′54″N 089°09′54″W
- Type: Spring-fed
- Basin countries: United States
- Surface area: 40 acres (0.16 km^{2})
- Max. depth: 24 ft (7.3 m)
- Surface elevation: 1,588 ft (484 m)

Mars Lake (also called Lake Sequilla or Sequilla Lake) is a small spring-fed rural lake in Oneida County in northern Wisconsin in the United States, near the intersection of U.S. Route 45 and U.S. Route 8, about 4.5 miles (7.2 km) north of Pelican Lake and 2,000 feet (610 m) northwest of the small settlement of Monico. It is located between the somewhat larger lakes Neptune Lake and Venus Lake.

Mars Lake is 40 acres (0.16 km^{2}) in area with a maximum depth of 24 feet (7.3 m) (another source says 12 feet (3.7 m).) Mars Lake is used for fishing. Panfish species include Largemouth Bass, Northern Pike, and Walleye, and Bluegill. There is a boat ramp.
