= American theater of World War II =

World War II area of operations including North and South America

American theater
- Part of World War II
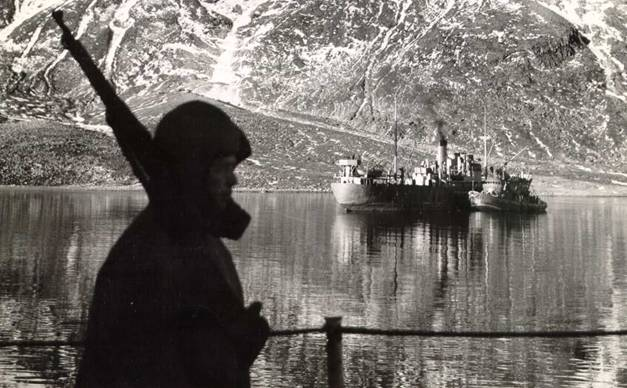
- A United States Coast Guardsman on sentry duty in Alaska during World War II
Date	1939–1945
Location	Americas, Atlantic Ocean, Pacific Ocean
Result	Allied victory: Axis objectives failed or did not affect the outcome of the conflict.

Belligerents
Allies: United States (from 1941); Canada; United Kingdom: Newfoundland; Free France; Netherlands (from 1940); Panama (from 1941); Costa Rica (from 1941); Dominican Republic (from 1941); El Salvador (from 1941); Haiti (from 1941); Honduras (from 1941); Nicaragua (from 1941); Cuba (from 1941); Guatemala (from 1941); Mexico (from 1942); Brazil (from 1942); Bolivia (from 1943); Colombia (from 1943); Ecuador (from 1945); Paraguay (from 1945); Peru (from 1945); Uruguay (from 1945); Venezuela (from 1945); Argentina (from 1945); Chile (from 1945)	Axis: Germany; Italy (from 1940); Japan (from 1941) Vichy France (until 1943)

Commanders and leaders
Franklin D. Roosevelt #; Harry S. Truman; W. L. Mackenzie King; Winston Churchill; Getúlio Vargas; Manuel Ávila Camacho; Fulgencio Batista	(Nazi Germany) Adolf Hitler; (Fascist Italy) Benito Mussolini; (Empire of Japan) Hirohito (surrendered)

The American theater was a theater of operations during World War II including all continental American territory, and extending 200 miles (320 km) into the ocean. Owing to North and South America's geographical separation from the central theaters of conflict (in Europe, the Mediterranean and Middle East, and the Pacific) the threat of an invasion of the continental United States or other areas in the Americas by the Axis powers was negligible and the theater saw relatively little conflict. Military engagements include the Battle of the River Plate, submarine attacks off the East Coast, the Aleutian Islands campaign, the Battle of the St. Lawrence, and the attacks on Newfoundland. Espionage efforts included Operation Bolívar.

== German operations ==
=== South America ===
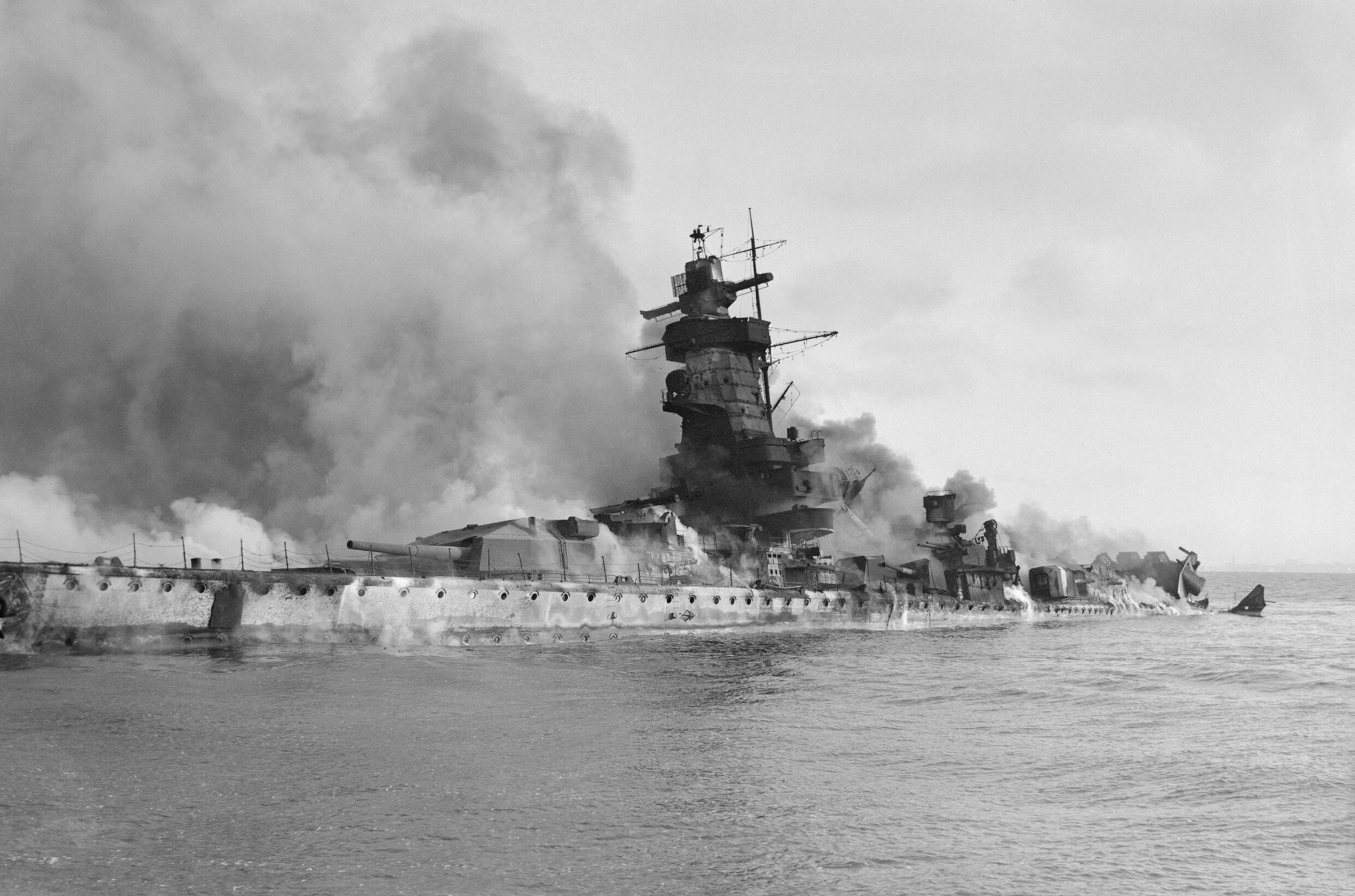
Admiral Graf Spee burning and sinking off Montevideo

==== Battle of the River Plate ====
The first naval battle during the war was fought on December 13, 1939, off the Atlantic coast of South America. The German "pocket battleship" Admiral Graf Spee (acting as a commerce raider) encountered one of the British naval units searching for her. Composed of three Royal Navy cruisers, HMS Exeter, Ajax, and Achilles, the unit was patrolling off the River Plate estuary of Argentina and Uruguay. In a bloody engagement, Admiral Graf Spee successfully repulsed the British attacks. Captain Hans Langsdorff then brought his damaged ship to shelter in neutral Uruguay for repairs. However, British intelligence successfully deceived Langsdorff into believing that a much superior British force had now gathered to wait for him, and he scuttled his ship at Montevideo to save his crew's lives before committing suicide. German combat losses were 96 killed or wounded, against 72 British sailors killed and 28 wounded. Two Royal Navy cruisers had been severely damaged.

==== Submarine warfare ====
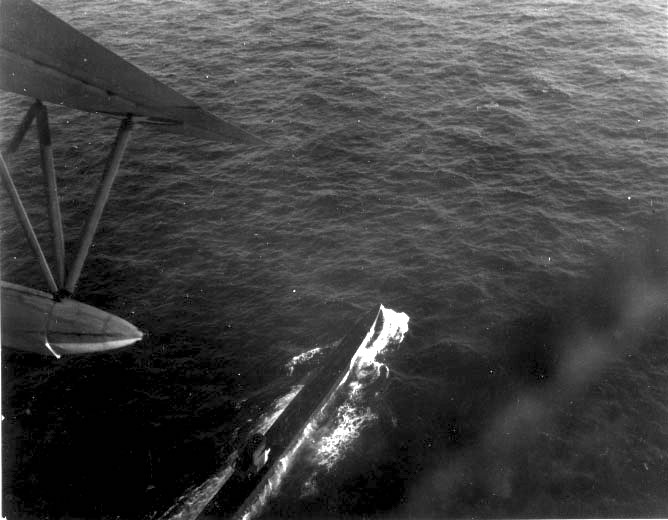
U-199 under attack by Brazilian Air Force PBY Catalina, 31 July 1943.

U-boat operations in the region (centered in the Atlantic Narrows between Brazil and West Africa) began in autumn 1940. After negotiations with Brazilian Foreign Minister Osvaldo Aranha (on behalf of dictator Getúlio Vargas), the U.S. introduced its Air Force along Brazil's coast in the second half of 1941. Germany and Italy subsequently extended their submarine attacks to include Brazilian ships wherever they were, and from April 1942 were found in Brazilian waters. On 22 May 1942, the first Brazilian attack (although unsuccessful) was carried out by Brazilian Air Force aircraft on the Italian submarine Barbarigo. After a series of attacks on merchant vessels off the Brazilian coast by U-507, Brazil officially entered the war on 22 August 1942, offering an important addition to the Allied strategic position in the South Atlantic. Although the Brazilian Navy was small, it had modern minelayers suitable for coastal convoy escort and aircraft which needed only small modifications to become suitable for maritime patrol. During its three years of war, mainly in Caribbean and South Atlantic, alone and in conjunction with the U.S., Brazil escorted 3,167 ships in 614 convoys, totalling 16,500,000 tons, with losses of 0.1%. Brazil saw three of its warships sunk and 486 men killed in action (332 in the cruiser Bahia); 972 seamen and civilian passengers were also lost aboard the 32 Brazilian merchant vessels attacked by enemy submarines. American and Brazilian air and naval forces worked closely together until the end of the Battle. One example was the sinking of U-199 in July 1943, by a coordinated action of Brazilian and American aircraft. Only in Brazilian waters, eleven other Axis submarines were known sunk between January and September 1943—the Italian Archimede and ten German boats: U-128, U-161, U-164, U-507, U-513, U-590, U-591, U-598, U-604, and U-662.

By late 1943, the decreasing number of Allied shipping losses in South Atlantic coincided with the increasing elimination of Axis submarines operating there. From then, the battle in the region was lost for Germans, even with the most of remaining submarines in the region receiving official order of withdrawal only in August of the following year, and with (Baron Jedburgh) the last Allied merchant ship sunk by a U-boat (U-532) there, on 10 March 1945.

=== United States ===
==== Duquesne Spy Ring ====
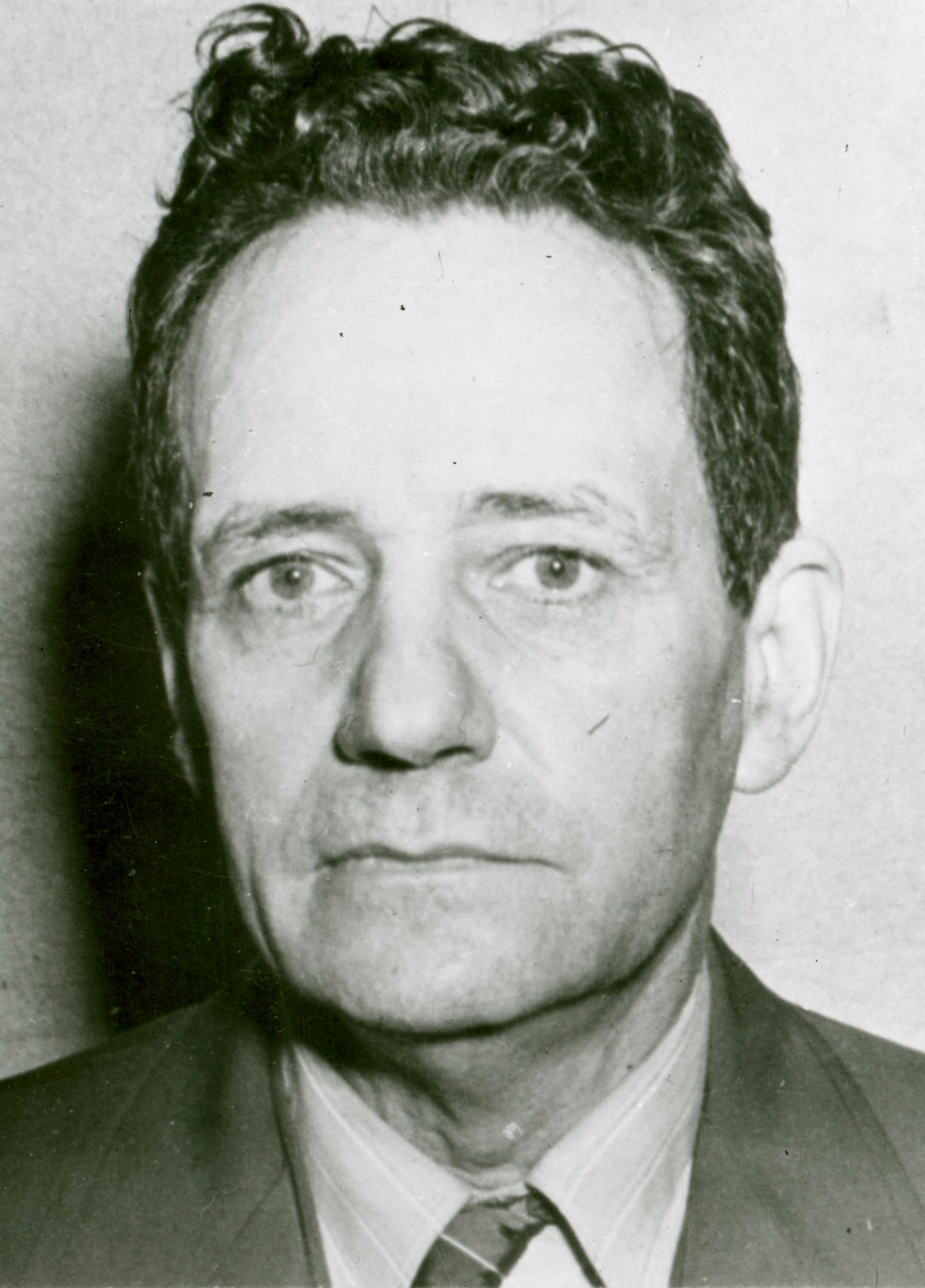
Fritz Joubert Duquesne, FBI file photo

Even before the war, a large Nazi spy ring was found operating in the United States. As of 2023, the Duquesne Spy Ring is still the largest espionage case in United States history that ended in convictions. The 33 German agents who formed the Duquesne spy ring were placed in key jobs in the United States to get information that could be used in the event of war and to carry out acts of sabotage. One man opened a restaurant and used his position to get information from his customers; another worked at an airline so he could report Allied ships crossing the Atlantic Ocean; others in the ring worked as deliverymen so they could deliver secret messages alongside normal messages. The ring was led by Captain Fritz Joubert Duquesne, a South African Boer who spied for Germany in both World Wars and is best known as "The man who killed Kitchener" after he was awarded the Iron Cross for his key role in the sabotage and sinking of HMS Hampshire in 1916. William G. Sebold, a double agent for the United States, was a major factor in the FBI's successful resolution of this case. For nearly two years, Sebold ran a secret radio station in New York for the ring. Sebold provided the FBI with information on what Germany was sending to its spies in the United States while allowing the FBI to control the information that was being transmitted to Germany. On June 29, 1941, six months before the U.S. declared war, the FBI acted. All 33 spies were arrested, found or pleaded guilty, and sentenced to serve a total of over 300 years in prison.

==== Operation Pastorius ====
After declaring war on the United States following the attack on Pearl Harbor, Adolf Hitler ordered the remaining German saboteurs to wreak havoc on America. The responsibility for carrying this out was given to German Intelligence (Abwehr). In the spring of 1942, nine agents were recruited (one eventually dropping out) and divided into two teams. The first, commanded by George John Dasch, included Ernst Peter Burger, Heinrich Heinck, and Richard Quirin; the second, under command of Edward Kerling, included Hermann Neubauer, Werner Thiel, and Herbert Haupt.

On June 12, 1942, the German submarine U-202 landed Dasch's team with explosives and plans at Amagansett, New York. Their mission was to destroy power plants at Niagara Falls and three Aluminum Company of America (ALCOA) factories in Illinois, Tennessee, and New York. However, Dasch instead turned himself in to the FBI, providing them with a complete list of his team members and an account of the planned missions, which led to their arrests.

On June 17, Kerling's team landed from U-584 at Ponte Vedra Beach, 25 miles (40 km) south-east of Jacksonville, Florida. They were ordered to place mines in four areas: the Pennsylvania Railroad in Newark, New Jersey; canal sluices in both St. Louis, Missouri, and Cincinnati, Ohio; and New York City's water supply pipes. The team members made their way to Cincinnati and then split up, two going to Chicago, Illinois, and the others to New York. Dasch's confession led to the arrest of all of the men by July 10.

Because the German agents were captured in civilian clothes (though they had landed in uniforms), they were tried by a military tribunal in Washington, D.C., with six of them sentenced to death for spying. President Franklin D. Roosevelt approved the sentences. The constitutionality of military tribunals was upheld by the U.S. Supreme Court in Ex parte Quirin on July 31, and the six men were executed by electrocution at the D.C. jail on August 8. Dasch and Burger were given thirty-year prison sentences because they had turned themselves in to the FBI and provided information about the others. Both were released in 1948 and deported to Germany. Dasch (aka George Davis), who had been a longtime American resident before the war, suffered a difficult life in Germany after his return from U.S. custody because he had betrayed his comrades to the U.S. authorities. As a condition of his deportation, he was not permitted to return to the United States, even though he spent many years writing letters to prominent American authorities (J. Edgar Hoover, President Eisenhower, etc.) seeking permission to return. He eventually moved to Switzerland and wrote a book, titled Eight Spies Against America.

==== Operation Magpie ====
In 1944 another attempt at infiltration was made, codenamed Operation Elster ("Magpie"). Elster involved Erich Gimpel and German-American defector William Colepaugh. Their mission's objective was to gather intelligence on a variety of military subjects and transmit it back to Germany by a radio to be constructed by Gimpel. They sailed from Kiel on U-1230 and landed at Hancock Point, Maine, on November 29, 1944. Both then made their way to New York, but the operation soon collapsed. Colepaugh lost his nerve and turned himself in to the FBI on December 26, confessing the whole plan and naming Gimpel. Gimpel was then arrested four days later in New York. Both men were sentenced to death, but eventually their sentences were commuted. Gimpel spent 10 years in prison, while Colepaugh was released in 1960 and operated a business in King of Prussia, Pennsylvania, before he retired to Florida.

=== Nazi landings in Canada ===
==== St. Martins, New Brunswick ====
One month earlier than the Dasch operation (on May 14, 1942), a solitary Abwehr agent, Marius A. Langbein, was landed by a U-boat (U-213) near St. Martins, New Brunswick, Canada. His mission, codenamed Operation Grete, after the name of the agent's wife, was to observe and report shipping movements at Montreal and Halifax, Nova Scotia (the main departure port for North Atlantic convoys). Langbein, who had lived in Canada before the war, changed his mind and moved to Ottawa, where he lived off his Abwehr funds until he surrendered to the Canadian authorities in December 1944. A jury found Langbein not guilty of spying, since he had never committed any hostile acts against Canada during the war.

==== New Carlisle, Quebec ====
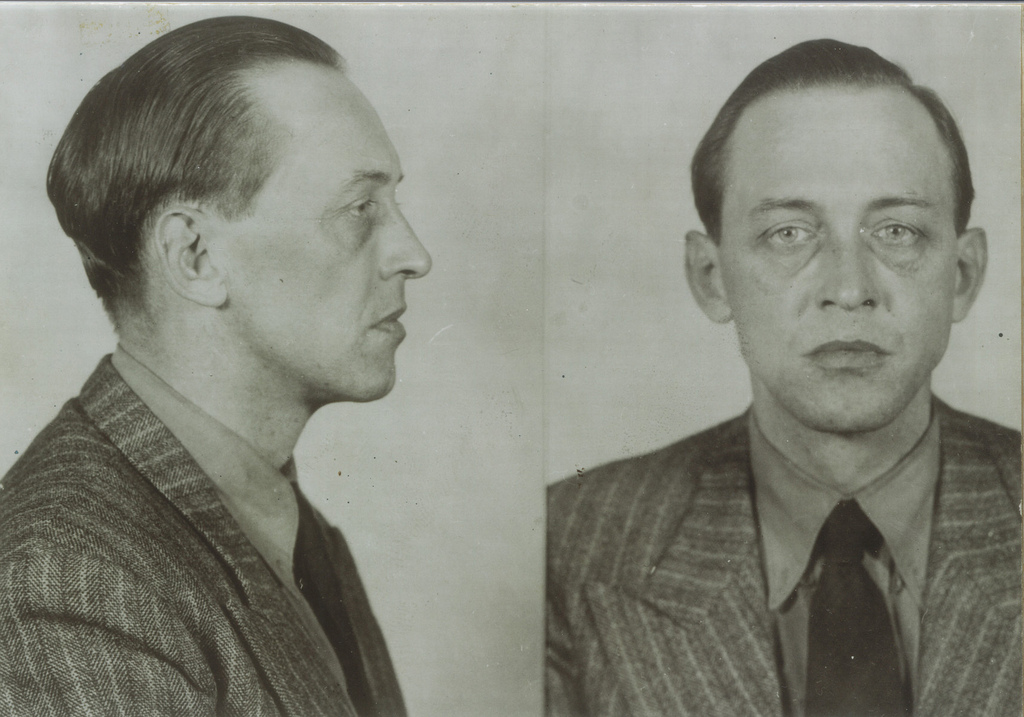
RCMP booking photo of Janowski

In November 1942, U-518 sank two iron ore freighters and damaged another off Bell Island in Conception Bay, Newfoundland, en route to the Gaspé Peninsula where, despite an attack by a Royal Canadian Air Force aircraft, it successfully landed a spy, Werner von Janowski, four miles (6.5 km) from New Carlisle, Quebec, at around 5 am on November 9, 1942.

Von Janowski arrived at the New Carlisle Hotel at 06:30 and checked in under the alias of William Brenton. The son of the hotel owner, Earle Annett Jr., grew suspicious of Von Janowski because of inconsistencies in the German spy's story and because he used an out-of-circulation note to pay his bill. When Von Janowski left for the train station, Annett followed him.

At the station, Annett alerted a Quebec Provincial Police constable, Alfonse Duchesneau, who boarded the train as it pulled away from the station and began searching for the stranger. Duchesneau located von Janowski, who said he was a radio salesman from Toronto. He stuck with this story until the policeman asked to search his bags; the stranger then confessed: "That will not be necessary. I am a German officer who serves his country as you do yourself." Inspection of von Janowski's personal effects upon his arrest revealed that he was carrying a powerful radio transmitter, among other things.

Von Janowski spent the next year as a double agent, codenamed WATCHDOG by the Allies and Bobbi by the Abwehr, sending false messages to Germany under the joint control of the RCMP and MI5, with spymaster Cyril Mills having been seconded to Canada to assist in the double cross initiative. The effectiveness and honesty of his "turn" is a matter of some dispute. For example, John Cecil Masterman wrote in The Double Cross System: "In November, WATCHDOG was landed from a U-boat in Canada together with a wireless set and an extensive questionnaire. This move on the part of the Germans threatened an extension of our activities to other parts of the world, but in fact the case did not develop very satisfactorily... WATCHDOG was closed down in the summer [of 1943]."

=== German landings in Newfoundland ===
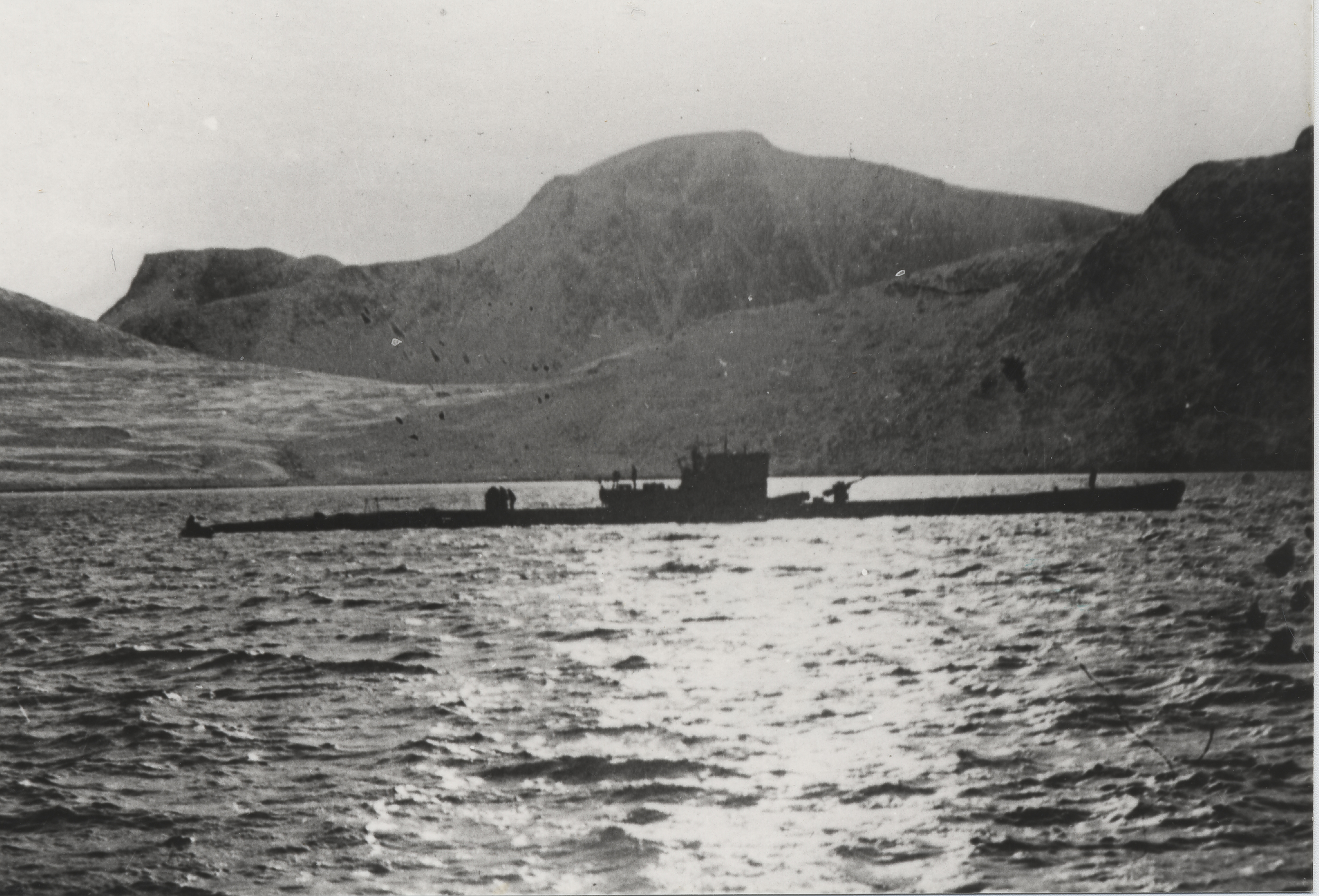
Type IXC/40 submarine U-537 at anchor in Martin Bay, Labrador

==== Weather Station Kurt, Martin Bay ====
Accurate weather reporting was important to the sea war, and on September 18, 1943, U-537 sailed from Kiel, via Bergen, Norway, with a meteorological team led by Professor Kurt Sommermeyer. They landed at Martin Bay, a remote location near the northern tip of Labrador on October 22, 1943, and successfully set up an automatic weather station ("Weather Station Kurt" or "Wetter-Funkgerät Land-26"), despite the constant risk of Allied air patrols. The station was powered by batteries that were expected to last about three months. At the beginning of July 1944, U-867 left Bergen to replace the equipment, but was sunk en route. The weather station remained at the site until it was recovered in the 1980s and placed in the Canadian War Museum.

=== U-boat operations ===
==== Atlantic Ocean ====
The Atlantic Ocean was a major strategic battle zone (the "Battle of the Atlantic") and when Germany declared war on the U.S., the East Coast of the United States offered easy pickings for German U-boats (referred to as the "Second Happy Time"). After a highly successful foray by five Type IX long-range U-boats, the offensive was maximized by the use of short-range Type VII U-boats, with increased fuel stores, replenished from supply U-boats called Milchkühe (milk cows). From February to May 1942, 348 ships were sunk, for the loss of two U-boats during April and May. U.S. naval commanders were reluctant to introduce the convoy system that had protected trans-Atlantic shipping and, without coastal blackouts, shipping was silhouetted against the bright lights of American towns and cities such as Atlantic City until a dim-out was ordered in May.

The cumulative effect of this campaign was severe; a quarter of all wartime sinkings – 3.1 million tons. There were several reasons for this. The American naval commander, Admiral Ernest King, as an apparent anglophobe, was averse to taking British recommendations to introduce convoys, U.S. Coast Guard and Navy patrols were predictable and could be avoided by U-boats, inter-service co-operation was poor, and the U.S. Navy did not possess enough suitable escort vessels (British and Canadian warships were transferred to the U.S. east coast).

==== U.S. East Coast ====
Several ships were torpedoed within sight of East Coast cities such as New York and Boston. The only documented World War II sinking of a U-boat close to New England shores occurred on May 5, 1945, when the German submarine U-853 torpedoed and sank the collier Black Point off Newport, Rhode Island. When Black Point was hit, the U.S. Navy immediately chased down the sub and began dropping depth charges. In recent years, U-853 has become a popular dive site. Its intact hull, with open hatches, is located in 130 feet (40 m) of water off Block Island, Rhode Island. A wreck discovered in 1991 off the New Jersey coast was concluded in 1997 to be that of U-869. Previously, U-869 had been thought to have been sunk off Rabat, Morocco.

==== U.S. Gulf of Mexico ====
Once convoys and air cover were introduced in the Atlantic, sinking numbers were reduced and the U-boats shifted to attack shipping in the Gulf of Mexico. During 1942 and 1943, more than 20 U-boats operated in the Gulf of Mexico. They attacked tankers transporting oil from ports in Texas and Louisiana, successfully sinking 56 vessels. By the end of 1943, the U-boat attacks diminished as the merchant ships began to travel in armed convoys.

In one instance, the tanker Virginia was torpedoed in the mouth of the Mississippi River by the German submarine U-507 on May 12, 1942, killing 26 crewmen. There were 14 survivors. Again, when defensive measures were introduced, ship sinkings decreased.

U-166 was the only U-boat sunk in the Gulf of Mexico during the war. Once thought to have been sunk by a torpedo dropped from a U.S. Coast Guard Utility Amphibian J4F aircraft on August 1, 1942, U-166 is now believed to have been sunk two days earlier by depth charges from the passenger ship SS Robert E. Lee's naval escort, the U.S. Navy sub-chaser, PC-566. It is thought that the J4F aircraft may have spotted and attacked another German submarine, U-171, which was operating in the area at the same time. U-166 lies in 5,000 feet (1,500 m) of water within a mile (1,600 m) of her last victim, Robert E. Lee.

==== Canada ====
From the start of the war in 1939 until VE Day, several of Canada's Atlantic coast ports became important to the resupply effort for the United Kingdom and later for the Allied land offensive on the Western Front. Halifax and Sydney, Nova Scotia, became the primary convoy assembly ports, with Halifax being assigned the fast or priority convoys (largely troops and essential material) with the more modern merchant ships, while Sydney was given slow convoys which conveyed bulkier material on older and more vulnerable merchant ships. Both ports were heavily fortified with shore radar emplacements, searchlight batteries, and extensive coastal artillery stations all manned by RCN and Canadian Army regular and reserve personnel. Military intelligence agents enforced strict blackouts throughout the areas and anti-torpedo nets were in place at the harbor entrances, making a direct attack on those facilities unfeasible because it was impossible for Germany to provide air support. Even though no landings of German personnel took place near these ports, there were frequent attacks by U-boats on convoys departing for Europe once these had reached the mouth of the St. Lawrence. Less extensively used, but no less important, was the port of Saint John which also saw matériel funneled through the port, largely after the United States entered the war in December 1941. The port's location within the protected waters of the Bay of Fundy made it a difficult target for attack. The Canadian Pacific Railway mainline from central Canada (which crossed the state of Maine) could be used to transport in aid of the war effort.

Although not crippling to the Canadian war effort, given the country's rail network to the east coast ports, but possibly more destructive to the morale of the Canadian public, was the Battle of the St. Lawrence, when U-boats began to venture upriver and attack domestic coastal shipping along Canada's east coast in the St. Lawrence River and Gulf of St. Lawrence from early 1942 through to the end of the shipping season in late 1944. From a German perspective, this area contained most of the military assets in North America that could realistically be targeted for attack, and therefore the St. Lawrence was the only zone that saw consistent warfare—albeit on a limited scale—in North America during World War II. Residents along the Gaspé coast and the St. Lawrence River and Gulf of St. Lawrence were startled at the sight of maritime warfare off their shores, with ships on fire and explosions rattling their communities, while bodies and debris floated ashore. The number of military losses is not known, although loose estimates can be made based on the number of surface units and submarines sunk.

==== Newfoundland ====
Five significant attacks on Newfoundland took place in 1942. On 3 March 1942, U-587 launched three torpedoes at St. John's; one hit Fort Amherst and two more hit the cliffs of Signal Hill below Cabot Tower. In autumn, German U-boats attacked four iron ore carriers serving the DOSCO iron mine at Wabana on Bell Island in Newfoundland's Conception Bay. The ships SS Saganaga and SS Lord Strathcona were sunk by U-513 on 5 September 1942, while SS Rose Castle and P.L.M 27 were sunk by U-518 on 2 November with the loss of 69 lives. After the sinkings, the submarine fired a torpedo that missed its target, the 3,000-ton collier Anna T, and struck the DOSCO loading pier and exploded. On 14 October 1942, the Newfoundland Railway ferry SS Caribou was torpedoed by U-69 and sunk in the Cabot Strait south of Port aux Basques. Caribou was carrying 45 crew and 206 civilian and military passengers. One hundred thirty-seven lost their lives, many of them Newfoundlanders. Half a dozen U-boat wrecks lie in waters around Newfoundland and Labrador, destroyed by Allied patrols.

==== Caribbean ====
A German submarine shelled the American Standard Oil refinery at the San Nicolas harbour and the "Arend"/"Eagle" Maatschappij (from the Dutch/British Shell Co.) near the Oranjestad harbour situated on the Island of Aruba (a Dutch colony) and some ships that were near the entrance to Lake Maracaibo on February 16, 1942. Three tankers, including the Venezuelan Monagas, were sunk. A Venezuelan gunboat, General Urdaneta, assisted in rescuing the crews.

A German submarine shelled the island of Mona, some 40 miles (64 km) from the main island of Puerto Rico, on March 2.

On 15 May 1943, CS-13, a Cuban Navy patrol boat, sank the German submarine U-176 northeast of Havana. U-176, a Type IXC U-boat commanded by Kapitänleutnant Reiner Dierksen, had sunk 11 Allied ships before entering Cuban waters while tracking a convoy. While escorting merchant vessels, CS-13, under Ensign Mario Ramírez Delgado, detected the submarine using sonar provided through U.S. military cooperation. After confirming the contact, the Cuban crew launched depth charges, successfully destroying the U-boat with all 53 crew members aboard.

==== Central America ====
Before 1941, the Central American nations had various diplomatic ties with Nazi Germany and the Empire of Japan. After the attack on Pearl Harbor, they declared war on the Axis nations. The Central American nations joined the Allied side, broke diplomatic relations with the Axis nations, and initiated persecutions of German and Italian immigrants.

During the course of the war, several merchant ships were sunk in the Caribbean by German submarines, for example the Tela, a Honduran cargo ship sunk by U-504 in 1942. This led the country to carry out constant air patrols over the coasts under fear of the approach of more German submarines or the general fear of an attack by Germany. Other Central American cargo ships sunk by U-boats are the Olancho, the Comayagua, and the Bluefields, of Honduran and Nicaraguan origins. Central American volunteers in the United States Army participated in both the European and Asia Pacific theater.

== Japanese operations ==
=== Aleutian Islands campaign ===
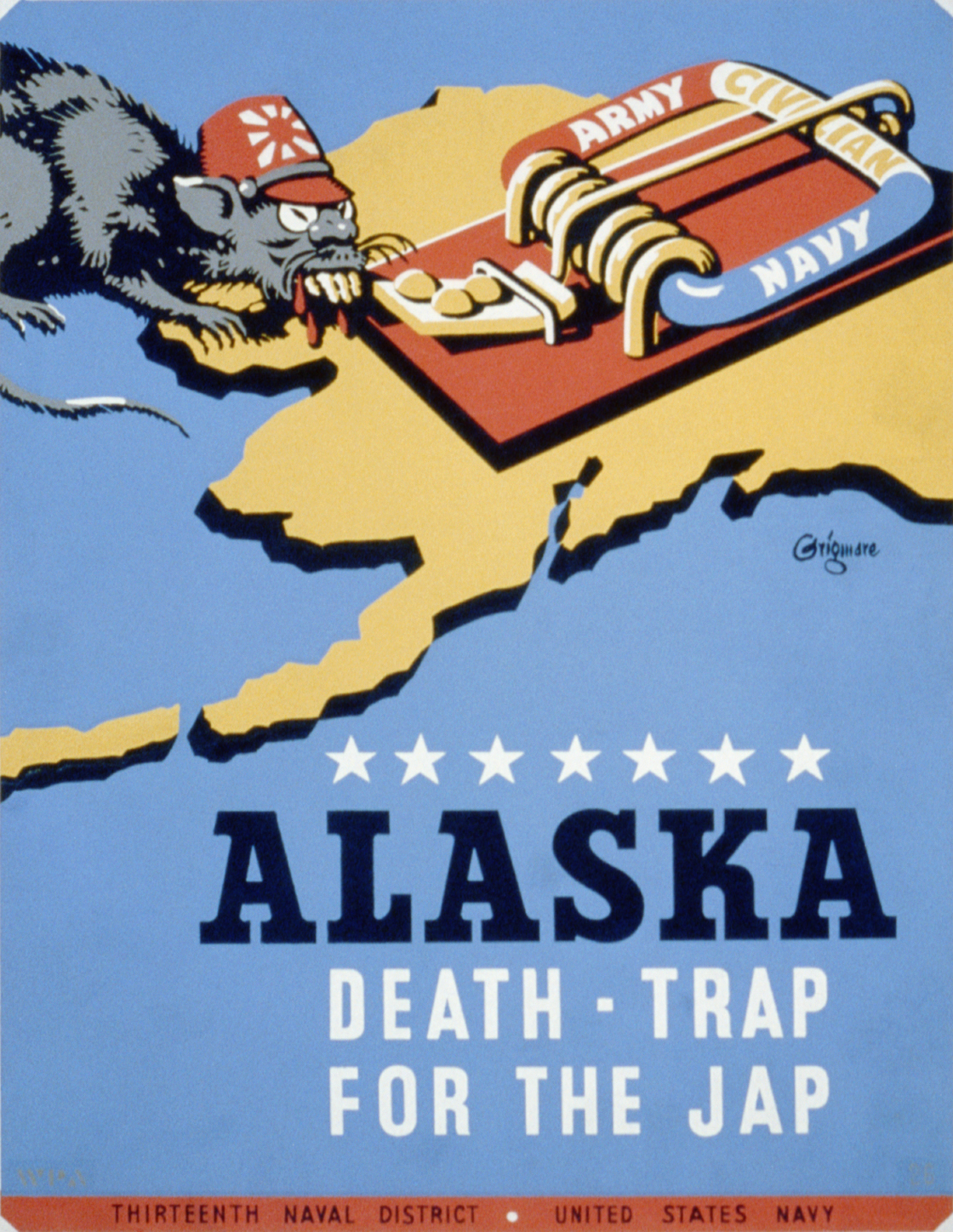
U.S. Navy propaganda poster from 1942/43 showing a rat representing Imperial Japan and a mousetrap labeled "Army – Navy – Civilian" on a map of Alaska, called "Death-Trap For The Jap"

Before Operation MI could be carried out, the Japanese decided to take the Aleutian Islands. On June 3–4, 1942, Japanese planes from two light carriers Ryūjō and Jun'yō struck the U.S. against the city of Unalaska, Alaska, at Dutch Harbor in the Aleutian Islands. Originally, the Japanese planned to attack Dutch Harbor simultaneously with its attack on Midway, but the Midway attack was delayed by one day. The attack only did moderate damage on Dutch Harbor, but 43 Americans were killed and 50 others wounded in the attack.

On June 6, two days after the bombing of Dutch Harbor, 500 Japanese marines landed on Kiska, one of the Aleutian Islands of Alaska. Upon landing, they killed two and captured eight United States Navy officers, then seized control of American soil for the first time. The next day, a total of 1,140 Japanese infantrymen landed on Attu via Holtz Bay, eventually reaching Massacre Bay and Chichagof Harbor. Attu's population at the time consisted of 45 Alaska Native Aleuts and two white Americans – Charles Foster Jones, a 60-year-old ham radio operator and weather observer, and his 62-year-old wife Etta, a teacher and nurse. The Japanese killed Charles Jones after interrogating him, while Etta Jones and the Aleut population were sent to Japan, where 16 of the Aleuts died, and Etta survived the war.

A year after Japan's occupation of Kiska and Attu, U.S. troops invaded Attu on May 11, 1943 and successfully retook the island after three weeks of fighting, killing 2,351 Japanese combatants and taking only 28 as prisoners of war at the cost of 549 lives. Three months later, on August 15, U.S. and Canadian forces landed on Kiska expecting the same resistance as at Attu; they later found the entire island empty, as most of the Japanese forces secretly evacuated weeks before the landing. Despite enemy absence on the island, over 313 Allied casualties were sustained nonetheless through car accidents, booby traps, land mines, and friendly fire, in which 28 Americans and four Canadians were killed in the exchange of fire between the two forces.

=== Submarine operations ===
Several ships were torpedoed within sight of West Coast Californian cities such as Los Angeles, Santa Barbara, San Diego, and Santa Monica. During 1941 and 1942, more than 10 Japanese submarines operated on the West Coast and Baja California. They attacked American, Canadian, and Mexican ships, successfully sinking over 10 vessels, including the Soviet Navy submarine L-16 on October 11, 1942.

==== Bombardment of Ellwood ====
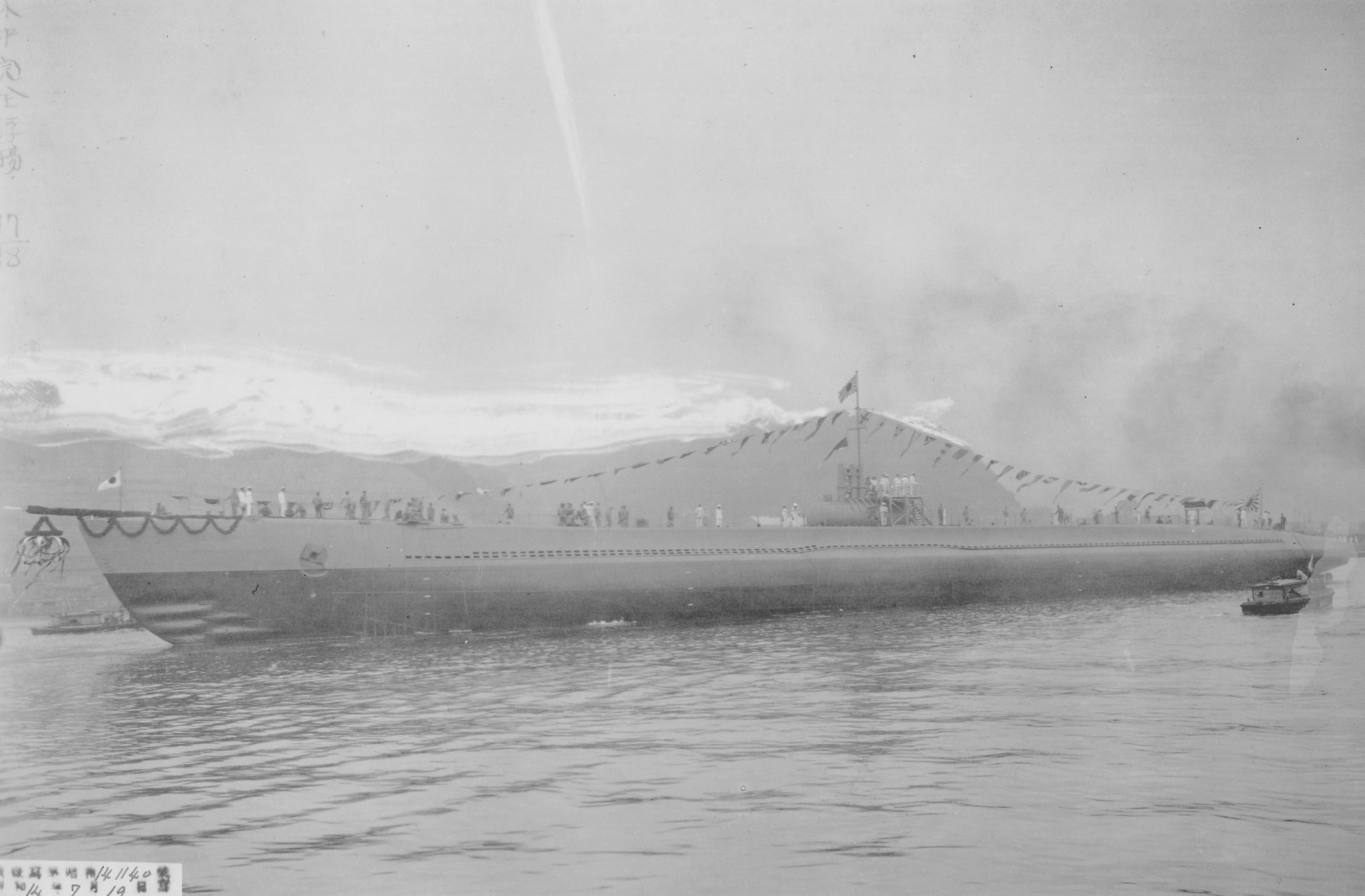
Japanese submarine I-17

The continental United States was first shelled by the Axis on February 23, 1942, when the Japanese submarine I-17 attacked the Ellwood Oil Field west of Goleta, near Santa Barbara, California. Although only a pumphouse and catwalk at one oil well were damaged, I-17 Captain Nishino Kozo radioed Tokyo that he had left Santa Barbara in flames. No casualties were reported, and the total cost of the damage was officially estimated at $500–1,000. News of the shelling triggered an invasion scare along the West Coast.

==== Bombardment of Estevan Point Lighthouse ====
More than five Japanese submarines operated in Western Canada during 1941 and 1942. On June 20, 1942, the Japanese submarine I-26, under the command of Yokota Minoru, fired 25–30 rounds of 5.5-inch shells at the Estevan Point lighthouse on Vancouver Island in British Columbia, but failed to hit its target. Though no casualties were reported, the subsequent decision to turn off the lights of outer stations caused difficulties for coastal shipping activity.

==== Bombardment of Fort Stevens ====
The second Japanese attack on the continental United States and the first on a military installation, took place when the Japanese submarine I-25, under the command of Tagami Akiji, surfaced near the mouth of the Columbia River in Oregon on the night of June 21/22, 1942, and fired shells toward Fort Stevens. The only damage officially recorded was to a baseball field's backstop. Probably the most significant damage was a shell that damaged some large phone cables. The Fort Stevens gunners were refused permission to return fire for fear of revealing the guns' location and/or range limitations to the sub. American aircraft on training flights spotted the submarine, which was subsequently attacked by a U.S. bomber, but escaped.

=== Lookout Air Raids ===
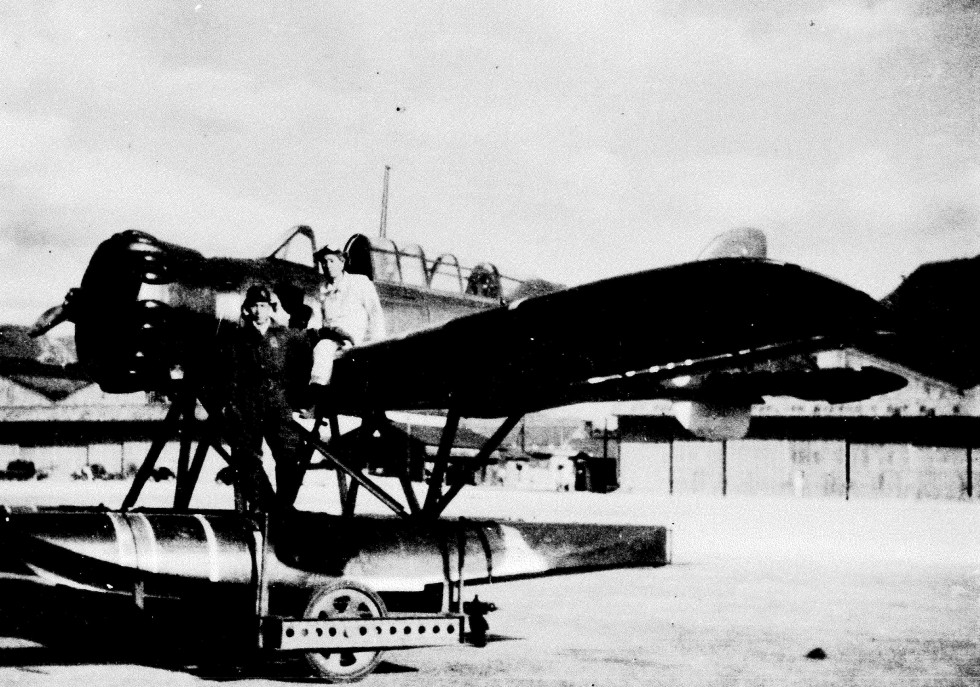
Nobuo Fujita standing by his E14Y

The Lookout Air Raids occurred on September 9, 1942. The second location to be subject to aerial bombing in the continental United States by a foreign power occurred when an attempt to start a forest fire was made by a Japanese Yokosuka E14Y1 "Glen" seaplane dropping two 80 kg (180 lb) incendiary bombs over Mount Emily, near Brookings, Oregon.

The seaplane, piloted by Nobuo Fujita, had been launched from the Japanese submarine aircraft carrier I-25. No significant damage was officially reported following the attack, nor after a repeat attempt on September 29.

=== Fire balloon attacks ===
Between November 1944 and April 1945, the Japanese Navy launched over 9,000 fire balloons toward North America. Carried by the recently discovered Pacific jet stream, they were to sail over the Pacific Ocean and land in North America, where the Japanese hoped they would start forest fires and cause other damage. About three hundred were reported as reaching North America, but little damage was caused.

Near Bly, Oregon, six people (five children and a woman) became the only deaths due to an enemy balloon bomb attack in the United States when a balloon bomb exploded. The site is marked by a stone monument at the Mitchell Recreation Area in the Fremont-Winema National Forest.

A fire balloon is also considered to be a possible cause of the third fire in the Tillamook Burn in Oregon. One member of the 555th Parachute Infantry Battalion died while responding to a fire in the Umpqua National Forest near Roseburg, Oregon, on August 6, 1945; other casualties of the 555th were two fractures and 20 other injuries.

== Cancelled Axis operations ==
=== Germany ===
In 1940, the German Air Ministry secretly requested designs from the major German aircraft companies for its Amerikabomber program, in which a long-range strategic bomber would strike the continental United States from the Azores (more than 2,200 miles (3,500 km) away). Planning was complete in 1942 with the submittal of the program to Goering's RLM offices in March 1942, resulting in piston-engined designs from Focke-Wulf, Heinkel, Junkers and Messerschmitt (who had built the ultra-long-range Messerschmitt Me 261 before WW II), but by mid-1944 the project had been abandoned as too expensive, with a serious increase in the need for defensive fighters, needing to come from Nazi Germany's by-then rapidly diminishing aviation production capacity. In 1943, the Germans were about to launch Operation Pelikan with the intent of sabotaging the Panama Canal. However, the plan was aborted after the Germans believed the mission had been compromised due to purported Allied knowledge of it.

Hitler had ordered that biological warfare should be studied only for the purpose of defending against it. The head of the Science Division of the Wehrmacht, Erich Schumann, lobbied for Hitler to be persuaded otherwise: "America must be attacked simultaneously with various human and animal epidemic pathogens, as well as plant pests." The plans were never adopted because they were opposed by Hitler.

=== Italy ===
An Italian naval commander, Junio Valerio Borghese, devised a plan to attack New York Harbor with midget submarines; however, as the tides of war changed against Italy, the plan was postponed and later scrapped.

=== Japan ===
Just after the attack on Pearl Harbor, a force of seven Japanese submarines patrolled the United States West Coast. The Wolfpack made plans to bombard targets in California on Christmas Eve or Christmas Day of 1941. However, the attack was postponed to December 27 in order to avoid attacking during the Christian festival and offending German and Italian allies. Eventually the plan was canceled altogether for fears of American reprisal. In 1946, an unexploded Japanese torpedo was found near the Golden Gate Bridge, and it has been interpreted as evidence of an attack, potentially targeting the bridge itself, in late December 1941.

The Japanese constructed a plan early in the Pacific War to attack the Panama Canal, a vital water passage in Panama, used during World War II primarily for the Allied supply effort. The Japanese attack was never launched because Japan suffered crippling naval losses at the beginning of conflict with the United States and United Kingdom (See: Aichi M6A).

The Imperial Japanese Army launched Project Z (also called the Z Bombers Project) in 1942, similar to the Nazi German Amerikabomber project, to design an intercontinental bomber capable of reaching North America. The Project Z plane was to have six engines of 5,000 horsepower each; the Nakajima Aircraft Company quickly began developing engines for the plane, and proposed doubling HA-44 engines (the most powerful engine available in Japan) into a 36-cylinder engine. Designs were presented to the Imperial Japanese Army, including the Nakajima G10N, Kawasaki Ki-91, and Nakajima G5N. None developed beyond prototypes or wind tunnel models, save for the G5N. In 1945, the Z project and other heavy bomber projects were cancelled.

During the final months of World War II, Japan had planned to use bubonic plague as a biological weapon against U.S. civilians in San Diego, California, during Operation Cherry Blossoms at Night. Planning was finalized on March 26, 1945, but shelved shortly thereafter due to the strong opposition of Chief of General Staff Yoshijirō Umezu. Umezu later explained his decision as such: "If bacteriological warfare is conducted, it will grow from the dimension of war between Japan and America to an endless battle of humanity against bacteria. Japan will earn the derision of the world."

== Other alarms ==
=== False alarms ===
These false alarms have generally been attributed to military and civilian inexperience with war and poor radars of the era. Critics have theorized they were a deliberate attempt by the Army to frighten the public in order to stimulate interest in war preparations.

==== Alerts following Pearl Harbor ====
On December 8, 1941, "rumors of an enemy carrier off the coast led to the closing of schools in Oakland, California," a blackout enforced by local wardens and radio silence followed that evening. The reports reaching Washington of an attack on San Francisco were regarded as credible. The affair was described as a test but Lt. Gen. John L. DeWitt of the Western Defense Command said "Last night there were planes over this community. They were enemy planes! I mean Japanese planes! And they were tracked out to sea. You think it was a hoax? It is damned nonsense for sensible people to assume that the Army and Navy would practice such a hoax on San Francisco." Rumors continued on the West Coast in the following days. An alert of a similar nature occurred in the Northeast on December 9. "At noon advices were received that hostile planes were only two hours' distance away." Although there was no general hysteria, fighter aircraft from Mitchel Field on Long Island took the air to intercept the "raiders". Wall Street had its worst sell off since the Fall of France, school children in New York City were sent home and several radio stations left the air. In Boston police shifted heavy stores of guns and ammunition from storage vaults to stations throughout the city, and industrial establishments were advised to prepare for a raid.

==== Battle of Los Angeles ====
The Battle of Los Angeles, also known as "The Great Los Angeles Air Raid", is the name given by contemporary sources to the imaginary enemy attack and subsequent anti-aircraft artillery barrage which took place in 1942 from February 24 and early on February 25 over Los Angeles, California. Initially, the target of the aerial barrage was thought to be an attacking force from Japan, but Secretary of the Navy Frank Knox speaking at a press conference shortly afterward called the incident a "false alarm." Newspapers of the time published a number of sensational reports and speculations of a cover-up to conceal an actual invasion by enemy airplanes. When documenting the incident in 1983, the U.S. Office of Air Force History attributed the event to a case of "war nerves" likely triggered by a lost weather balloon and exacerbated by stray flares and shell bursts from adjoining batteries.

=== Minor alerts ===
==== 1942 ====
In May and June the San Francisco Bay Area underwent a series of alerts:

- May 12: A twenty-five-minute air-raid alert.
- May 27: West Coast defenses put on alert after Army codebreakers learned that the Japanese intended a series of hit-and-run attacks in reprisal for the Doolittle Raid.
- May 31: The battleships USS Colorado and USS Maryland set sail from the Golden Gate to form a line of defense against any Japanese attack mounted on San Francisco.
- June 2: A nine-minute air-raid alert, including at 9:22 pm a radio silence order applied to all radio stations from Mexico to Canada.

== See also ==
- American Theater (1914–1918)
- Amerikabomber
- Battle of the Atlantic
- German submarine U-550 (discovered off Massachusetts)
- German submarine U-853 (destroyed off Rhode Island)
- German submarine U-869 (destroyed off New Jersey)
- Greenland in World War II
- Knights of Columbus Hostel fire
- List of Japanese spies, 1930–1945
- Operation Pastorius
- Project Z
- List of theaters and campaigns of World War II
- Attacks on the United States

== Notes ==
=== Works cited ===
- Barone, João (2013). 1942: O Brasil e sua guerra quase desconhecida [1942: Brazil and its almost Forgotten War] (in Portuguese). Rio de Janeiro. ISBN 978-85-209-3394-7.
- Beebe, Dean (1996). Cargo of Lies: The True Story of a Nazi Double Agent in Canada. University of Toronto Press. ISBN 0-8020-0731-7.
- Carey, Alan C. (2004). Galloping Ghosts of the Brazilian Coast. Lincoln, NE USA: iUniverse, Inc. ISBN 978-0-595-31527-7.
- Carruthers, Bob (2011). The U-Boat War in the Atlantic: Volume III: 1944–1945. Coda Books. ISBN 978-1-78159-161-1.
- Maximiano, Cesar Campiani; Neto, Ricardo Bonalume (2011). Brazilian Expeditionary Force in World War II. Long Island City: Osprey Publishing. ISBN 978-1-84908-483-3.
- Morison, Samuel Eliot. (1947). History of United States Naval Operations in World War II: The Battle of the Atlantic; September 1939 – May 1943. Boston: Little Brown. ISBN 978-0-252-06963-5.
- O'Hara, Vincent (2004). The German fleet at war, 1939–1945. Naval Institute Press.
- Votaw, Homer C. (1950–51). The Brazilian Navy in World War II. US Government Printing Office; Congressional Record: Proceedings and Debates of US Congress, Volume 96, Part 8.Senate and Military Review, Volume XXX, Number X.
