= Venus Lake =

Lake in Oneida County, Wisconsin, U.S.

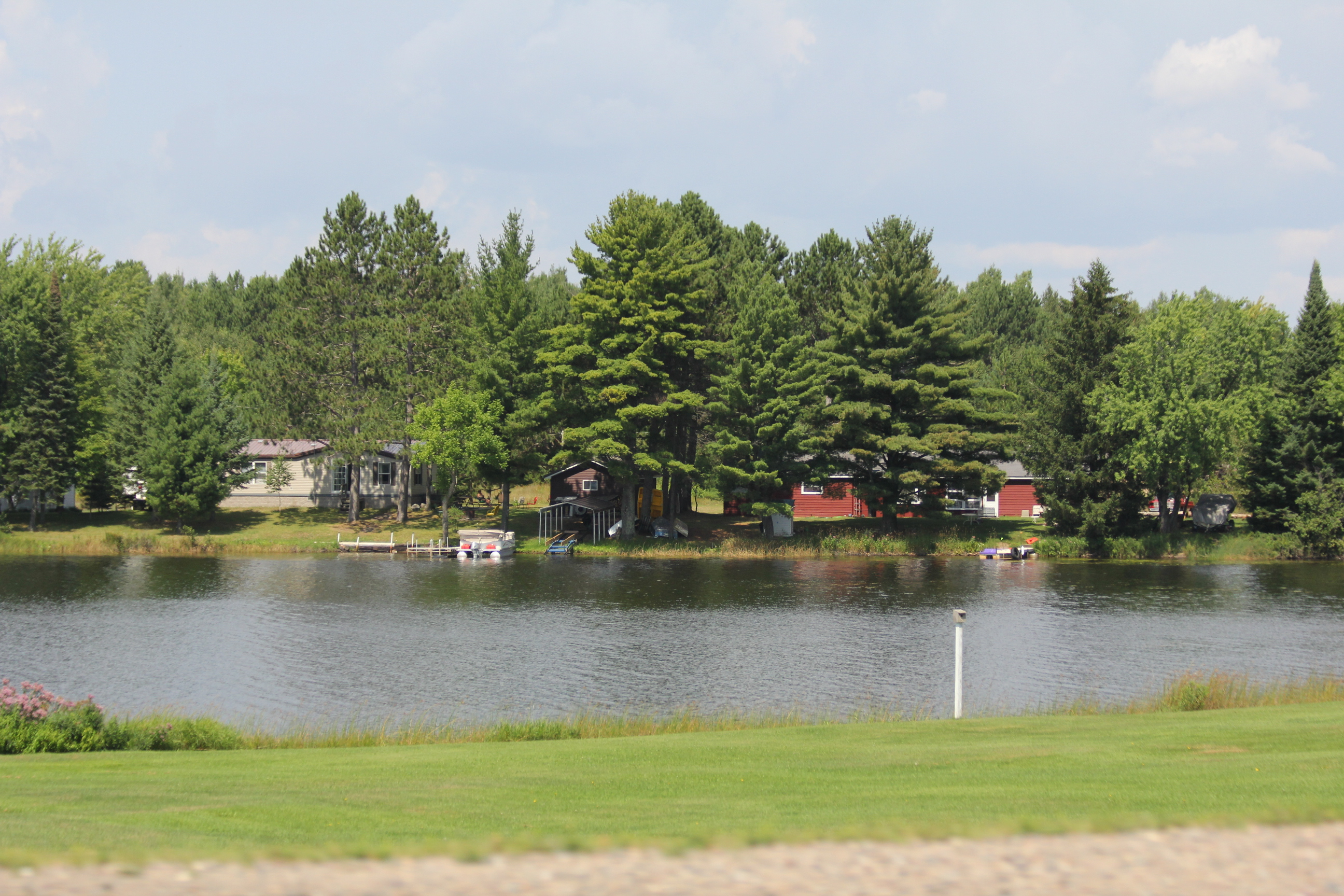
- Venus Lake from U.S. 45 / U.S. 8

- Location within Wisconsin Location within the United States
- Location: Oneida County, Wisconsin
- Coordinates: 45°34′37″N 089°09′53″W
- Type: Drainage
- Basin countries: United States
- Surface area: 64 acres (0.26 km^{2})
- Max. depth: 21 ft (6.4 m)
- Surface elevation: 1,588 ft (484 m)

Venus Lake (also called Lake Kechewaishke or Kechewaishke Lake) is a small mesotrophic rural lake in Oneida County in northern Wisconsin in the United States, at the intersection of U.S. Route 45 and U.S. Route 8, about 4 miles (6.4 km) north of Pelican Lake and adjacent to the small settlement of Monico. The slightly smaller Mars Lake and the somewhat larger Neptune Lake are nearby, to the northwest.

Venus Lake is 64 acres (0.26 km^{2}) in area with a maximum depth of 21 feet (6.4 m). Venus Lake is used for fishing. Panfish species include Largemouth Bass and Northern Pike, and Walleye and Bluegill. Rusty Crayfish, a rapidly expanding invasive species, are present in the lake. There is no boat ramp.
