= Pelican Lake =

Pelican Lake may refer to:

== Lakes ==
=== Canada ===
- Pelican Lake (Manitoba)
- Pelican Lake (Kenora District, Ontario)
- Pelican Lake (Cochrane District, Ontario)
- Pelican Lake (Saskatchewan)

=== United States ===
- Pelican Lake in Desha County, Arkansas
- Pelican Lake (California) in Marin County
- Pelican Lake, Florida
- Pelican Lake (Crow Wing County, Minnesota)
- Pelican Lake (Grant and Douglas counties, Minnesota)
- Pelican Lake (St. Louis County, Minnesota)
- Pelican Lake (Otter Tail County, Minnesota)
- Pelican Lake (Codington County, South Dakota)
- Pelican Lake (Lake County, South Dakota)
- Pelican Lake (Wisconsin) in Oneida County

== Places ==
- Pelican Lake Township, Grant County, Minnesota, United States
- Pelican Lake, Wisconsin, United States

== Other uses ==
- Pelican Lake First Nation, Saskatchewan, Canada

== See also ==
- Pelican Lagoon, South Australia
- Pelican Lagoon Conservation Park, South Australia
