= Pelican River =

Pelican River is the name of several rivers in the United States:

- Pelican River (Otter Tail River tributary)
- Pelican River (Vermilion River tributary)
- Pelican River (Wisconsin River tributary)

== See also ==
- Pelican Creek (disambiguation)
