= Pelican River (Wisconsin River tributary) =

River in Wisconsin

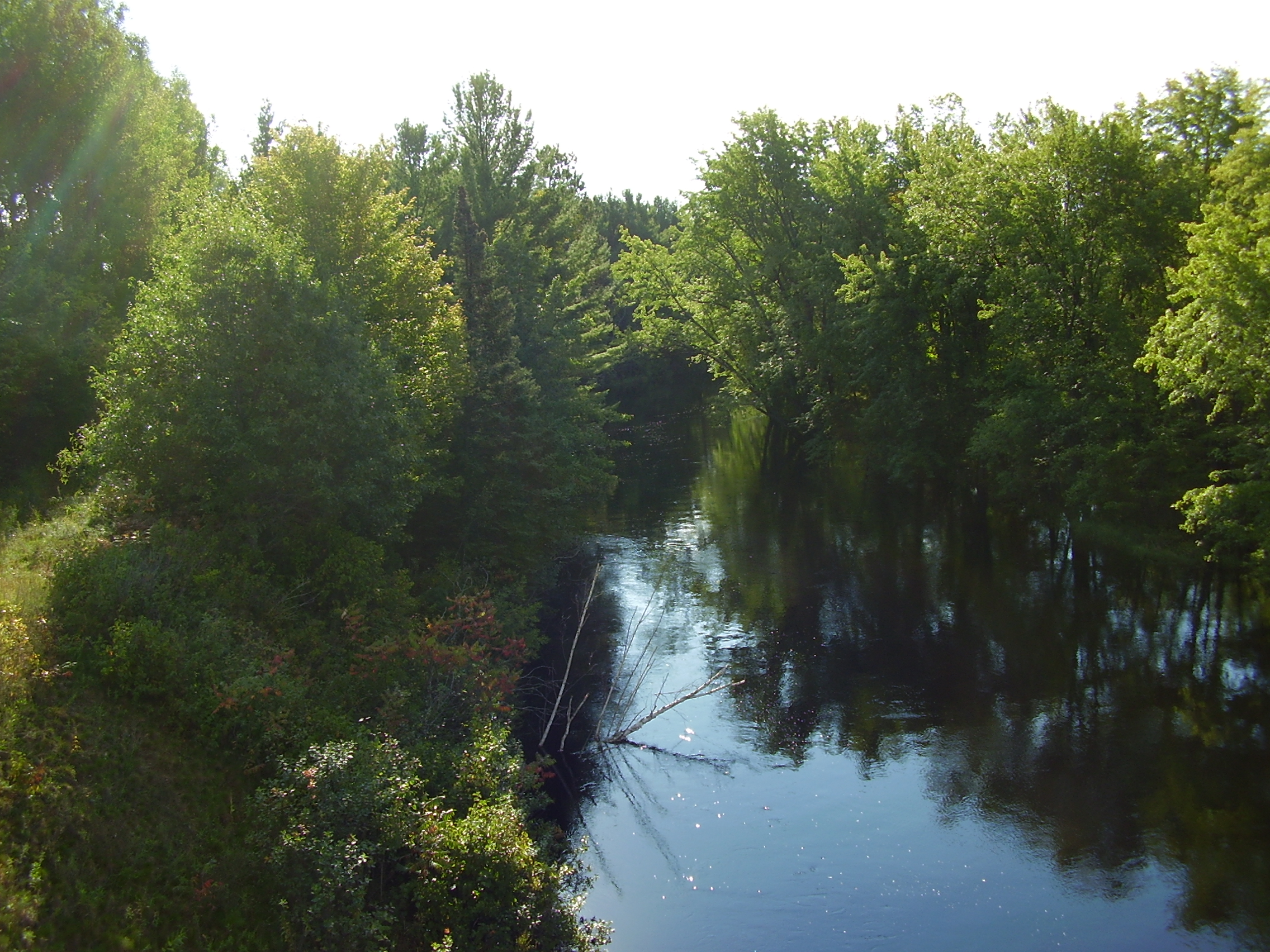
- Pelican River from highway 17 bridge.
- Native name: Zhede-ziibi (Ojibwe)

Location
- Country: United States
- Location: Oneida County, Wisconsin

Physical characteristics
- Source
  - location: Pelican Lake
  - coordinates: 45.526626°N 89.206232°W
- Mouth
  - location: Oneida County, Wisconsin
  - coordinates: 45.629956°N 89.426242°W
  - elevation: 1,526 feet (465 m)

The Pelican River is a river in Oneida County, Wisconsin. The source is Pelican Lake and the mouth is the confluence with the Wisconsin River in Rhinelander.

The Pelican River was a travel artery for the Pelican Lake Band of the Ojibwe Indians when they needed to go to Lac du Flambeau or other central Ojibwe locations.
