= Pelican Island (Kimberley coast) =

Island of Western Australia

Coordinates: 14°46′8″S 128°46′32″E

Pelican Island is an island off the Kimberley coast of Western Australia.

The island is approximately 8 kilometres (5 mi) off-shore with a total area of about 19.1 hectares (47 acres). It is situated in the Joseph Bonaparte Gulf close to the Northern Territory border.

It is an important habitat for many birds including the Australian darter, common greenshank, eastern reef egret, rufous night heron, brahminy kite, and sacred kingfisher.

== See also ==
- Pelican Island (disambiguation) § Australia
