= Pelican Point, South Australia =

Pelican Point South Australia
- Coordinates: 37.927330°S 140.426780°E
- Population: 81 (SAL 2021)
- Established: 31 October 1996
- Postcode(s): 5291
- Location: 39 km (24 mi) SW of Mount Gambier
- LGA(s): District Council of Grant
- State electorate(s): Mount Gambier
- Federal division(s): Barker
Localities around Pelican Point:
Carpenter Rocks	Carpenter Rocks	Kongorong
	Pelican Point	Blackfellows Caves
		Blackfellows Caves
- Footnotes: Adjoining localities

Pelican Point is a coastal town in South Australia that surrounds a headland on the continental coastline. It consists mostly of holiday shacks. The north side of the point faces Bungaloo Bay. The point was previously known as Pointe des Cordonniers. The current boundaries were created on 31 October 1996 including both the Bungaloo Bay and Pelican Point shack areas.

Pelican Point is located within the federal Division of Barker, the state electoral district of Mount Gambier and the local government area of the District Council of Grant.

== See also ==
- Pelican Point (disambiguation)
