= Pelikan (organization) =

Political group in Turkey

Pelikan is a group in Turkey, which became known publicly after the 'All Hail!' (Selam Olsun!) article published at a website named as 'Pelican File' (Pelikan Dosyası) on 1 May 2016, and during the period that resulted with resignation of Ahmet Davutoğlu. Hilal Kaplan, Melih Altınok, Süheyb Öğüt, Cemil Barlas, Kurtuluş Tayiz, Selman Öğüt, and Haşmet Babaoğlu has been claimed to be group members. The 'All Hail' (Selam Olsun!) text – which was inside of a newly opened blog site and exposed the existence of Pelikan group – was shared by Cemil Barlas, Merve Taşçı, Atifet Ulusoy, Elif Şahin and Filiz Gündüz from personal Twitter accounts on 1 May 2016. The memo has been claimed to portray not only Davutoğlu as target but also other people serving inside the government as the target, and even it has been claimed that the memo accuses Hakan Fidan as being Davutoğlu's man.

An old member of the group, Fırat Erez, defined the group's purpose during foundation process 'creating AKP's social media team' and said that the fake sharings made by the group at social media was disclosed. The sharings of Erez was interpreted as "reopening old wounds" on the press. Pelikan group shares messages to the public opinion that wanted to be conveyed by the group, with different social media accounts. This kind of accounts named as "troll accounts" by some people. Occasionally, some social media collaborations and advertisements are also made by the group. In addition to those, the group has been stated to have been funding some people like İnci Sözlük founder Serkan İnci.

The account named as @BosphorusGlobal operated on Twitter; is the account of a civil society organisation named as 'Boğaziçi Küresel İlişkiler Merkezi' (Bosporus Global Relations Center, or simply Bosporus Global). President of Turkey Recep Tayyip Erdoğan visited the mansion for 1.5 hours in 2019 to get information about research on Bosphorus Global's social media accounts and their abroad activity. In October 2020, public benefit association status was given to Boğaziçi Küresel. The organization has been seen as backing the organisation named as Pelikan, on the mails between Süheyb Öğüt which leaked to WikiLeaks.

The group has also gotten reactions from inside of AKP. Old deputy Aydın Ünal, shared a statement which was later deleted: "Let's record that to the history while there's enough time for precaution: The organisation also named as 'Pelikan' is slyly poisoning AK Party. Their aims were causing to rotting of the party from inside; they're successfully progressing. If a boldly measure wouldn't be achieved, our movement will be wasted, lots of price will be paid.". Ünal has also made a statement in 2020, saying ''Pelikan is the new FETÖ''. The group which also called as 'new parallel structuring' by others, has drawn attention with election fraud claims after the Turkish local elections on 31 March 2019.

Abdülhamit Gül was allegedly targeted by Pelikan group during a change on the cabinet has been brought to the agenda. On 17 September 2019, Sabah newspaper writer Dilek Güngör, implicitly criticized the Minister of Justice by saying ''As you see, history is repeating itself, but nobody is able to notice the size of danger on the judiciary. Now I'm asking: If a plot lawsuit opens like that one in 17–25 by FETO ists who infiltrated those organizations which are currently capturing the judiciary, who can say what at that time?'' on her column titled as ''Do you aware of danger on the judiciary!'' (Yargıda tehlikenin farkında mısınız!).

It is also claimed that group also had an impact on resignation of Süleyman Soylu on 12 April 2020. Old AKP deputy Aydın Ünal described the resignation as "A coup to AK Parti made by Pelikan". This resignation was rejected by Recep Tayyip Erdoğan.

Aydın Ünal said of the Pelikan group, "It is not an organization that defends the President, but an organization that hides behind him and does dirty deeds up to committing constitutional crimes." It is also claimed that the group is also funded by businessman Can Paker. Investigations and lawsuits were launched against Aydın Ünal, former copywriter of President Recep Tayyip Erdoğan, for his statement "Pelikan is the new FETÖ". The legal processes that started with Süheyb Öğüt's complaint were finalized.

== Resignation of Ahmet Davutoğlu from prime ministry ==
Ahmet Davutoğlu said about the memo that resulted with his resignation: "Each of us are coming across with such stuffs. No longer the ideas are clashing, who has how many trolls and how much does they damage to opponent side? During my breakaway process, something named as 'Pelican file' emerged. Each of them are slanders for the people who knows me a little bit. Well, who created that; they're unknown. I know but the society doesn't know. They hid theirselves. They did many insults."
