= Pelican Lake Township, Grant County, Minnesota =

Township in Minnesota, United States

Pelican Lake Township
- Township
- Location within the state of Minnesota Pelican Lake Township (the United States)
- Coordinates: 46°4′3″N 95°49′40″W
- Country: United States
- State: Minnesota
- County: Grant

Area
  - Total: 35.4 sq mi (91.7 km^{2})
  - Land: 27.2 sq mi (70.4 km^{2})
  - Water: 8.2 sq mi (21.3 km^{2})
- Elevation: 1,253 ft (382 m)

Population (2000)
  - Total: 425
  - Density: 16/sq mi (6/km^{2})
- Time zone: UTC-6 (Central (CST))
  - Summer (DST): UTC-5 (CDT)
- ZIP code: 56309
- Area code: 218
- FIPS code: 27-50128
- GNIS feature ID: 0665272

Pelican Lake Township is a township in Grant County, Minnesota, United States. The population was 425 at the 2000 census.

Pelican Lake Township was organized in 1876, and named after Pelican Lake.

== Geography ==
According to the United States Census Bureau, the township has a total area of 35.4 square miles (91.7 km^{2}), of which 27.2 square miles (70.3 km^{2}) is land and 8.2 square miles (21.3 km^{2}) (23.23%) is water.

== Demographics ==
As of the census of 2000, there were 425 people, 169 households, and 130 families residing in the township. The population density was 15.6 people per square mile (6.0/km^{2}). There were 367 housing units at an average density of 13.5/sq mi (5.2/km^{2}). The racial makeup of the township was 97.65% White, and 2.35% from two or more races.

There were 169 households, out of which 29.6% had children under the age of 18 living with them, 71.6% were married couples living together, 3.0% had a female householder with no husband present, and 22.5% were non-families. 18.3% of all households were made up of individuals, and 7.1% had someone living alone who was 65 years of age or older. The average household size was 2.51 and the average family size was 2.86.

In the township the population was spread out, with 24.9% under the age of 18, 4.0% from 18 to 24, 20.7% from 25 to 44, 32.0% from 45 to 64, and 18.4% who were 65 years of age or older. The median age was 45 years. For every 100 females, there were 105.3 males. For every 100 females age 18 and over, there were 111.3 males.

The median income for a household in the township was $36,667, and the median income for a family was $37,308. Males had a median income of $27,292 versus $18,750 for females. The per capita income for the township was $18,329. About 5.6% of families and 7.0% of the population were below the poverty line, including 4.7% of those under age 18 and 7.5% of those age 65 or over.
