= USS Pelican =

USS Pelican may refer to the following ships of the United States Navy:

- USS Pelican (AM-27), laid down 10 November 1917 at Gas Engine and Power Co., Morris Heights, New York
- USS Pelican (AMS-32), laid down as YMS–441 on 27 November 1943 by Robert Jacob Inc., City Island, New York
- USS Pelican (MHC-53), an Osprey-class coastal mine hunter

== See also ==
- USFS Pelican, a United States Bureau of Fisheries fisheries science research vessel in service from 1930 to 1940 which then served in the Fish and Wildlife Service fleet as the fishery patrol vessel US FWS Pelican from 1940 to 1958
