= Monico, Wisconsin =

- Town
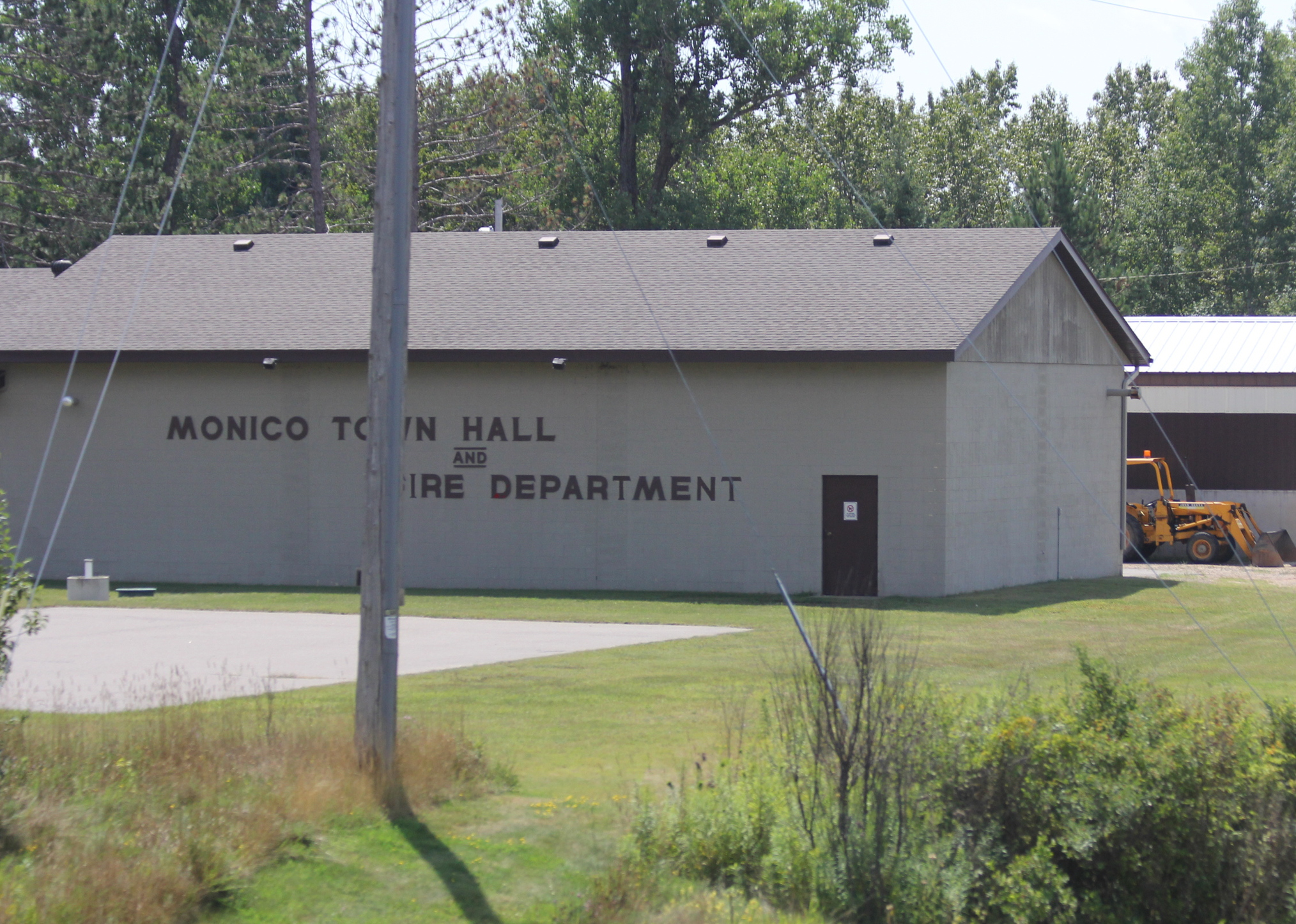
- town hall

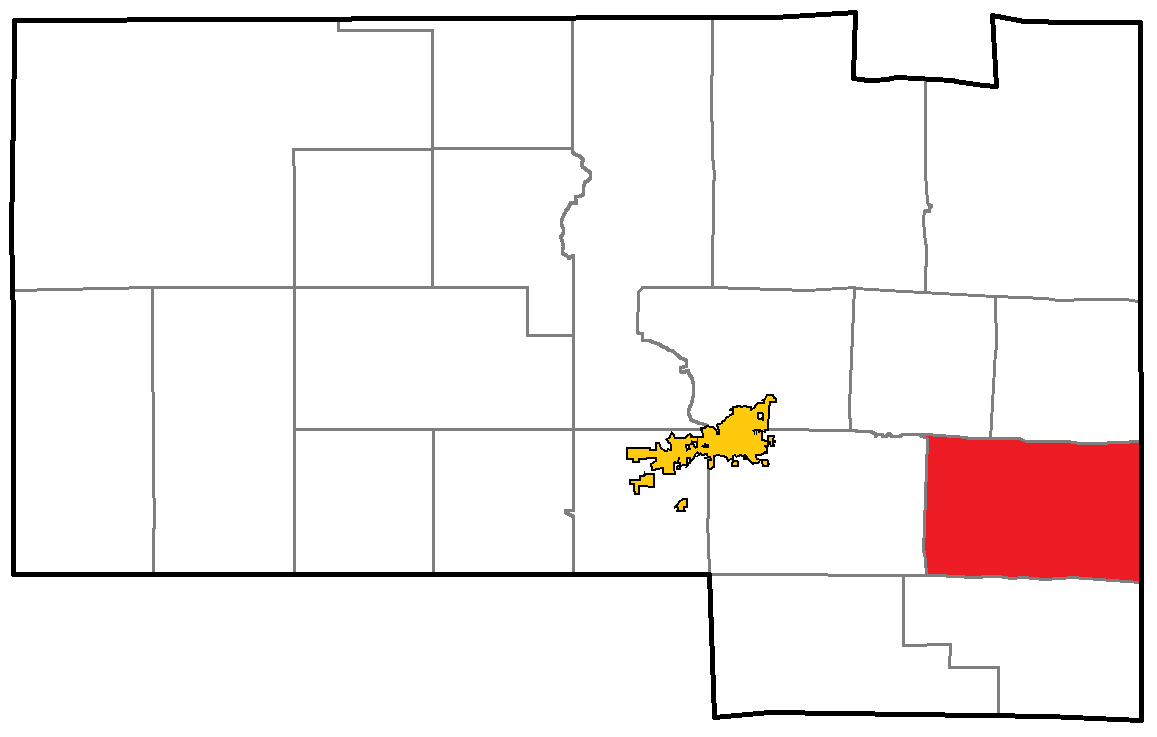
- Location of Monico, within Oneida County
- Coordinates: 45°36′2″N 89°8′37″W
- Country: United States
- State: Wisconsin
- County: Oneida

Area
  - Total: 54.6 sq mi (141.3 km^{2})
  - Land: 54.1 sq mi (140.1 km^{2})
  - Water: 0.46 sq mi (1.2 km^{2})
- Elevation: 1,617 ft (493 m)

Population (2020)
  - Total: 260
  - Density: 4.8/sq mi (1.9/km^{2})
- Time zone: UTC-6 (Central (CST))
  - Summer (DST): UTC-5 (CDT)
- Area codes: 715 & 534
- FIPS code: 55-53662
- GNIS feature ID: 1583737

Monico is a town in Oneida County, Wisconsin, United States. The population was 260 at the 2020 census. The unincorporated community of Monico is located in the town.

== Geography ==
According to the United States Census Bureau, the town has a total area of 54.6 square miles (141.3 km^{2}), of which 54.1 square miles (140.1 km^{2}) is land and 0.5 square mile (1.2 km^{2}) (0.84%) is water.

== Demographics ==
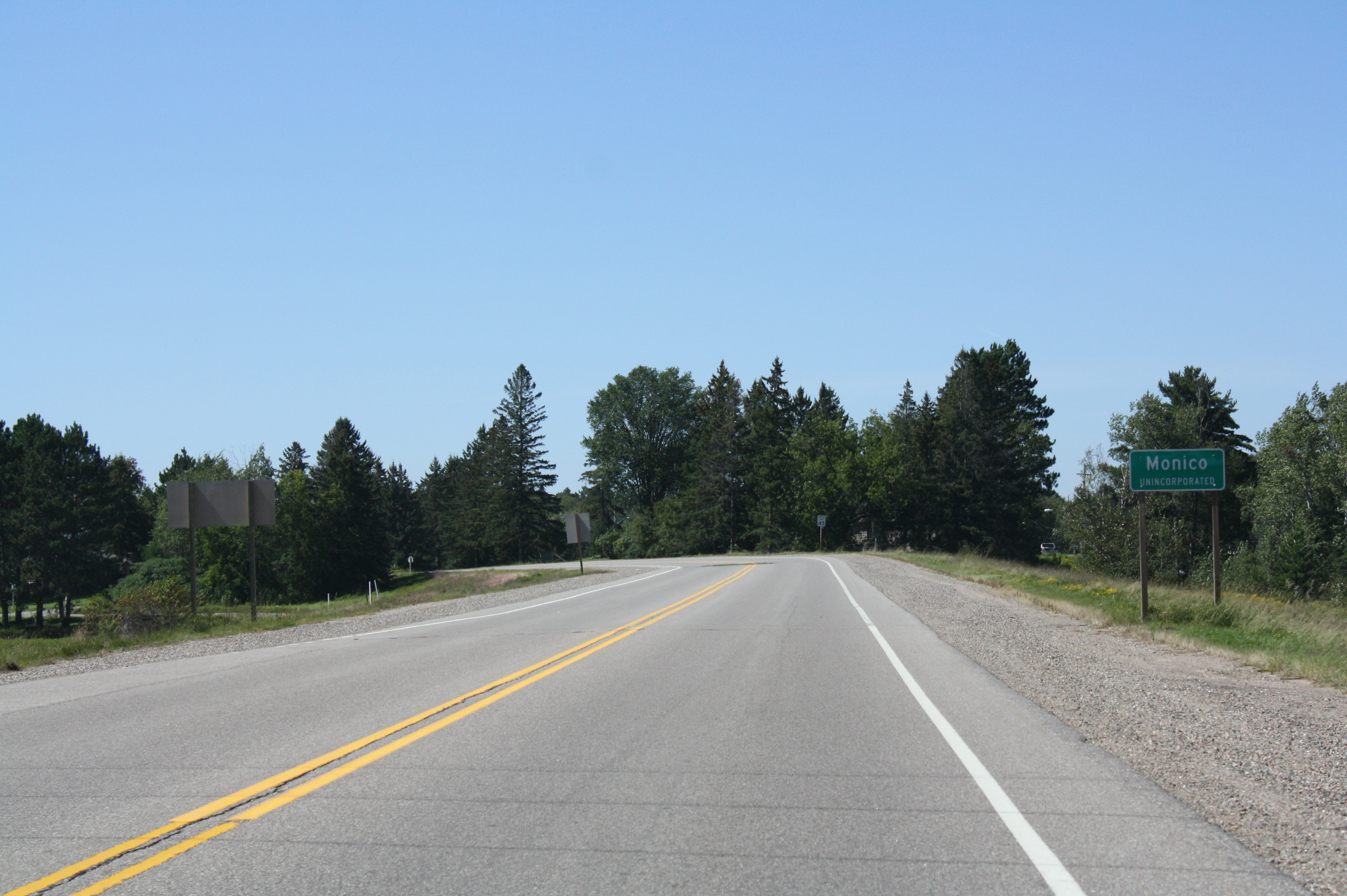
Sign for the unincorporated community of Monico

As of the census of 2000, there were 364 people, 128 households, and 99 families residing in the town. The population density was 6.7 people per square mile (2.6/km^{2}). There were 216 housing units at an average density of 4.0 per square mile (1.5/km^{2}). The racial makeup of the town was 98.35% White, 0.27% Native American, 0.55% from other races, and 0.82% from two or more races. Hispanic or Latino of any race were 0.55% of the population.

There were 128 households, out of which 43.8% had children under the age of 18 living with them, 63.3% were married couples living together, 7.0% had a female householder with no husband present, and 21.9% were non-families. 18.8% of all households were made up of individuals, and 7.8% had someone living alone who was 65 years of age or older. The average household size was 2.84 and the average family size was 3.22.

In the town, the population was spread out, with 32.1% under the age of 18, 4.9% from 18 to 24, 33.5% from 25 to 44, 19.8% from 45 to 64, and 9.6% who were 65 years of age or older. The median age was 37 years. For every 100 females, there were 103.4 males. For every 100 females age 18 and over, there were 102.5 males.

The median income for a household in the town was $33,281, and the median income for a family was $34,844. Males had a median income of $31,250 versus $20,938 for females. The per capita income for the town was $12,973. About 4.0% of families and 4.6% of the population were below the poverty line, including 3.0% of those under age 18 and 5.4% of those age 65 or over.

== Transportation ==
The Rhinelander-Oneida County Airport (KRHI) serves Monico, the county and surrounding communities with both scheduled commercial jet service and general aviation services.

== See also ==
- List of towns in Wisconsin
