= Operation Pelikan =

German plan for disabling the Panama Canal during World War II

- Part of the American Theater of World War II
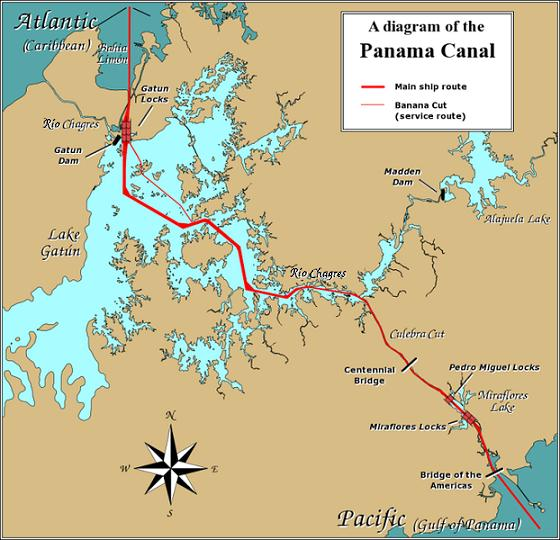
- A schematic of the Panama Canal, illustrating the sequence of locks and passages.
- Location: Panama Canal, Panama
- Planned by: Nazi Germany
- Objective: Sabotage of the Panama Canal
- Date: 1943
- Outcome: Aborted

Operation Pelikan (German: Unternehmen Pelikan), also known as Projekt 14, was a German plan for crippling the Panama Canal during World War II. In mid-late 1943 the Wehrmacht had completed preparations to haul two Ju 87 Stukas with folding wings on two U-boats to a Colombian island near the coast of Panama, reassemble the planes, arm them with "special bombs", and then send them to attack the Gatun Dam. After completing the mission, the pilots would fly to a neutral country and seek internment. However, Germany called off the plan, for unknown reasons, at the last minute. Rumours among the Germans who planned the sabotage were that it had been called off due to betrayal. Most of these types of plans involved acts of sabotage using agents in place and/or landed by U-boat.

== Plans ==
The Germans had been planning to target the Panama Canal as early as 1939 on the grounds that the Nazis believed the United States would inevitably enter the war. The original plan by 1941 was to send Focke-Wulf Fw 200 Condors disguised as civilian aircraft to pro-German Ecuador and convert them locally. This plan was left until 1943 when it was considered again. The plan then became to send disassembled Stukas in parts over to Colombia's San Andres Island and reassemble the planes there. They would then launch off floats before divebombing the Gatun Lake locks or dam. A sabotage team would also be dropped with the intent for them to cause damage to the spillway. After completing the mission, they were to extract themselves to a nearby neutral South American nation and submit to internment or escape via U-boat.

The Americans did have radar at their bases at either end of the Panama Canal, though it was of the similar type they had at Hawaii during attack on Pearl Harbor, but it was not known if the Germans were aware of this. Shortly before the operation was due to begin, as the German operatives had begun loading parts of the Stukas onboard U-boats, the operation was cancelled. It is not known why the order to cancel was made, but it is believed it was due to a Nazi belief that the mission had been compromised due to field information implying the Allies were aware of what Pelikan was intended to do.

== See also ==
- Colombia during World War II
- Operation Bolívar
- Panama Canal strike
