= Atlantic Narrows =

Portion of the Atlantic Ocean

The Atlantic Narrows is a relatively narrow portion of the Atlantic Ocean between South America and West Africa. More specifically, it lies approximately at the Equator where by definition the North Atlantic meets the South Atlantic and roughly between Natal, Brazil and Greenville, Liberia.
