= Pelican Island =

Pelican Island may refer to:

== Places ==
=== Australia ===
- Pelican Island (Tasmania)
- Pelican Island (Kimberley coast), Western Australia.

=== United States ===
- Pelican Island, Tulare Lake, California
- Pelican Island, Ocean County, New Jersey
- Pelican Island, Suffolk County, New York
- Pelican Island, Galveston County, Texas
- Pelican Island, Corpus Christi Bay, Texas
- Pelican Island National Wildlife Refuge, Florida

=== In the West Indies ===
- Pelican Island (Antigua and Barbuda)
- Pelican Island (Barbados)
- Pelican Island (British Virgin Islands)
- Pelikan Rock, Sint Maarten
- Pelican Island (Trinidad and Tobago)

=== Elsewhere ===
- Pelican Island (Albania)
- Pelican Island, Palmyra Atoll, in the central Pacific Ocean
- Pelican Islands Ecological Reserve, Manitoba, Canada

== Other uses ==
- "The Pelican Island" (1828), a poem by James Montgomery
