= Aydın Ünal =

Turkish politician (born 1970)

Aydın Ünal MP

Member of the Grand National Assembly
- Incumbent
- Assumed office 7 June 2015
- Constituency: Ankara (II) (Jun 2015, Nov 2015)

Personal details
- Born: 1970 (age 55–56) Keçiören, Ankara Province, Turkey
- Party: Justice and Development Party
- Education: Hacettepe University

Aydın Ünal (born 1970) is a Turkish politician from the Justice and Development Party (AK Party) who currently serves as a Member of Parliament for Ankara's second electoral district. He was first elected in the June 2015 general election and was re-elected in November 2015.

== Early life and career ==
Aydın Ünal was born in Keçiören, Ankara Province in 1970. He is originally from Ankara's Güdül district. After completing his secondary and high-school education in Ankara, he studied at the Middle East Technical University Faculty of Scientific Literature Department of Chemistry before graduating from Hacettepe University Faculty of Education as an English teacher. He later wrote in several magazines and newspapers before writing numerous poems and stories.

== Political career ==
In 2002, he was appointed as an advisor to the Minister of State responsible for the Economy. He went on to serve as an advisor to the Prime Minister of Turkey, the Chief Undersecretary to the Prime Minister and later to the President of Turkey. Between 2007 and 2015, he wrote articles for Recep Tayyip Erdoğan. In 2016, he caused controversy for suggesting that the Office of the Prime Minister would be occupied by a 'low profile' politician focusing only on technical issues after the resignation of Ahmet Davutoğlu.

In the June 2015 general election, he was elected as a Member of Parliament for Ankara's second electoral district from the Justice and Development Party and was re-elected in the November 2015 general election. He served as a member of the Turkish delegation at the NATO Parliamentary Assembly in the 25th and 26th Parliaments, while also serving as a member of the Parliamentary Human Rights Investigatory Commission in the 26th Parliament.

In December 2017, Ünal published an editorial in the Yeni Şafak listing the names of nine Turkish journalists in exile and seemed to suggest they would be targets for assassination, saying, “Better to get ready for intra-organization extrajudicial killings instead of carrying out operations over judicial theater.”
