= Pelikán =

Pelikán (Czech and Slovak feminine: Pelikánová) and Pelikan is a surname. It means 'pelican' in various languages, including Czech and German, in which the surname appears most often. Notable people with the surname include:

- Alfred Pelikan (1893–1987), German-American painter and educator
- Boris Pelikan (1861–1931), Ukrainian politician
- Emilie Mediz-Pelikan (1861–1908), Austrian landscape painter
- Franz Pelikan (1925–1994), Austrian footballer
- János Pelikán (born 1995), Hungarian cyclist
- Jaroslav Pelikan (1923–2006), American Christian scholar
- Jiří Pelikán (chess player) (1906–1984), Czech-Argentine chess master
- Jiří Pelikán (politician) (1923–1999), Czech journalist and politician
- Lisa Pelikan (born 1964), French actress
- Radka Pelikánová (born 1977), Czech tennis player
- Robert Pelikán (born 1979), Czech lawyer
- Wilhelm Pelikan (1893–1981), German-Austrian chemist, anthroposophist and pharmacist

== See also ==
- Konrad Pellikan (1478–1556), German teacher and author
