= Pelican (Bill Short) =

A Pelican is one of a series of boats designed by Captain Bill Short with Pelican names, including the Pelican (12’) in 1959 the Great Pelican (16’) and the Pacific Pelican (14’7”). All are prams with bowsprits and lug rigs.
