= Pelican Creek =

Pelican Creek may refer to:

- Pelican Creek, Queensland, a locality in the Barcaldine Region, Queensland, Australia
- Pelican Creek (Bahamas), a river in The Bahamas
