= Pelican Lake (Grant and Douglas counties, Minnesota) =

Lake in the state of Minnesota, United States

- Location within Minnesota
- Location: Grant County, Minnesota
- Coordinates: 46°3′28″N 95°48′8″W
- Type: lake

Pelican Lake is a lake in Grant County and Douglas counties, in the U.S. state of Minnesota.

Pelican Lake was named for the pelicans frequently seen at the lake by early settlers.

== See also ==
- List of lakes in Minnesota
