= Pelikan Rock, Sint Maarten =

Islet off Sint Maarten in the Dutch Caribbean

Coordinates: 18°01′04″N 63°01′05″W

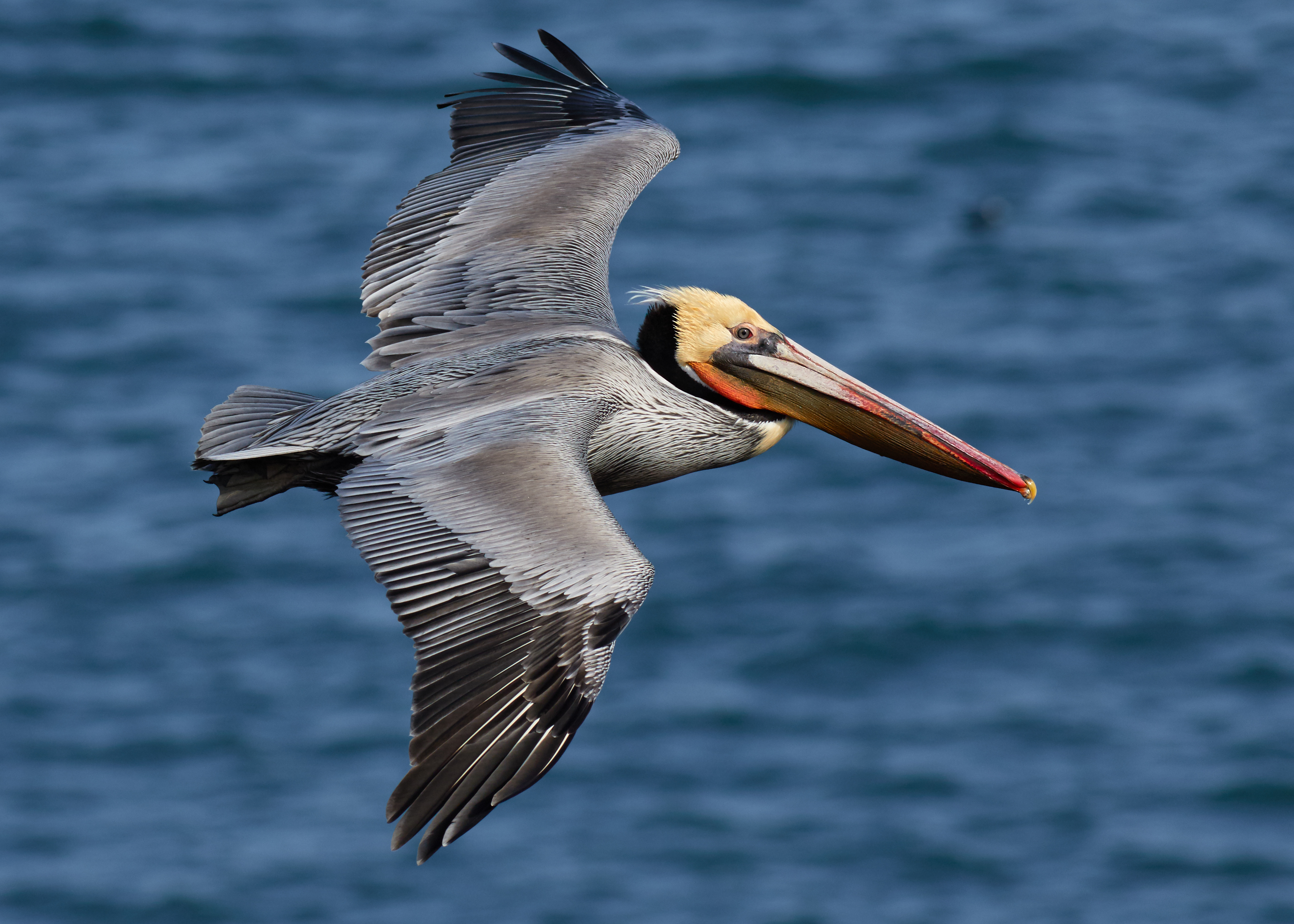
Brown pelicans nest on Pelikan Rock

Pelikan Rock is a small rocky islet, about 1 hectare (2.5 acres) in area, lying to the south-east of the coast of the island of Saint Martin, and belonging to the country of Sint Maarten in the Dutch Caribbean. It, along with the waters of the surrounding marine park, has been identified as a 328 ha Important Bird Area by BirdLife International because it supports nesting colonies of seabirds, including brown pelicans, laughing gulls, royal terns and, probably, Sargasso shearwaters.
