= Monico (community), Wisconsin =

Monico, Wisconsin
- Unincorporated community
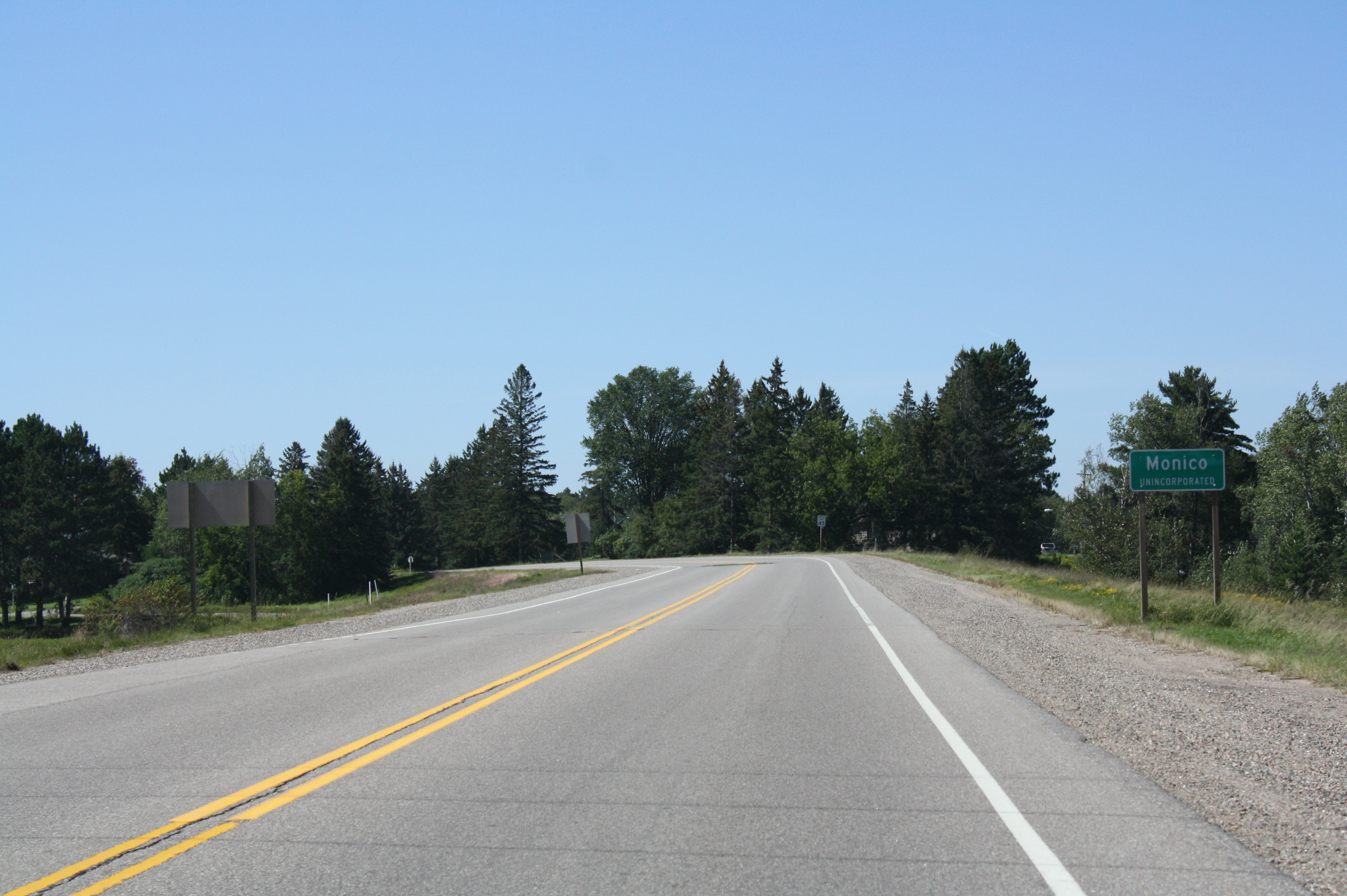
- Sign on US 8 / US 45

- Location within Wisconsin Location within the United States
- Coordinates: 45°34′35″N 89°09′18″W
- Country: United States
- State: Wisconsin
- County: Oneida
- Elevation: 1,601 ft (488 m)
- Time zone: UTC-6 (Central (CST))
  - Summer (DST): UTC-5 (CDT)
- Area codes: 715 & 534
- GNIS feature ID: 1569652

Monico is an unincorporated community located in the town of Monico, Oneida County, Wisconsin, United States. Monico is located on Venus Lake at the junction of U.S. routes 8 and 45 and Wisconsin Highway 47, 13 miles (21 km) east-southeast of Rhinelander.

== Gallery ==
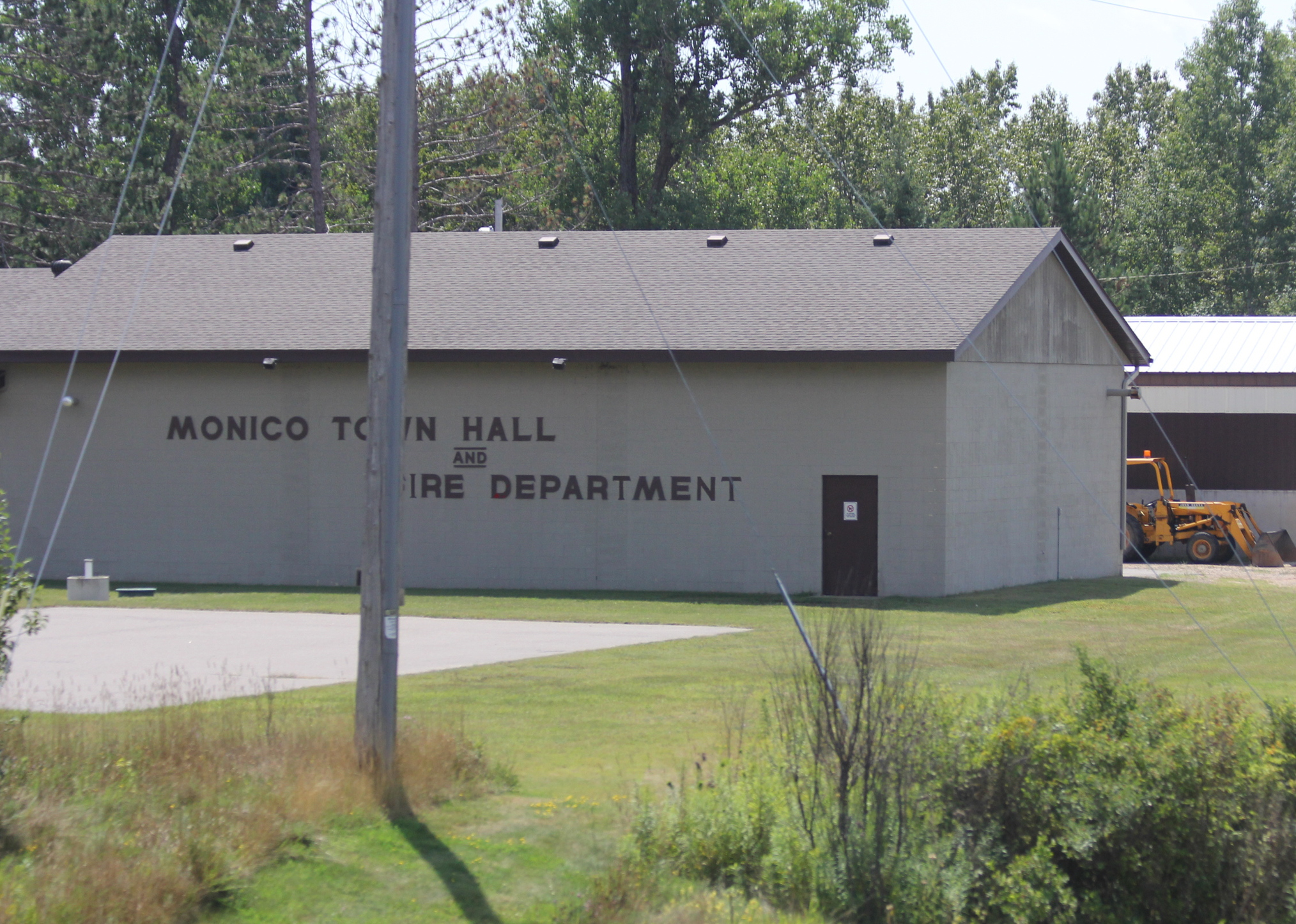
Fire Department and Town hall for the Town of Monico.

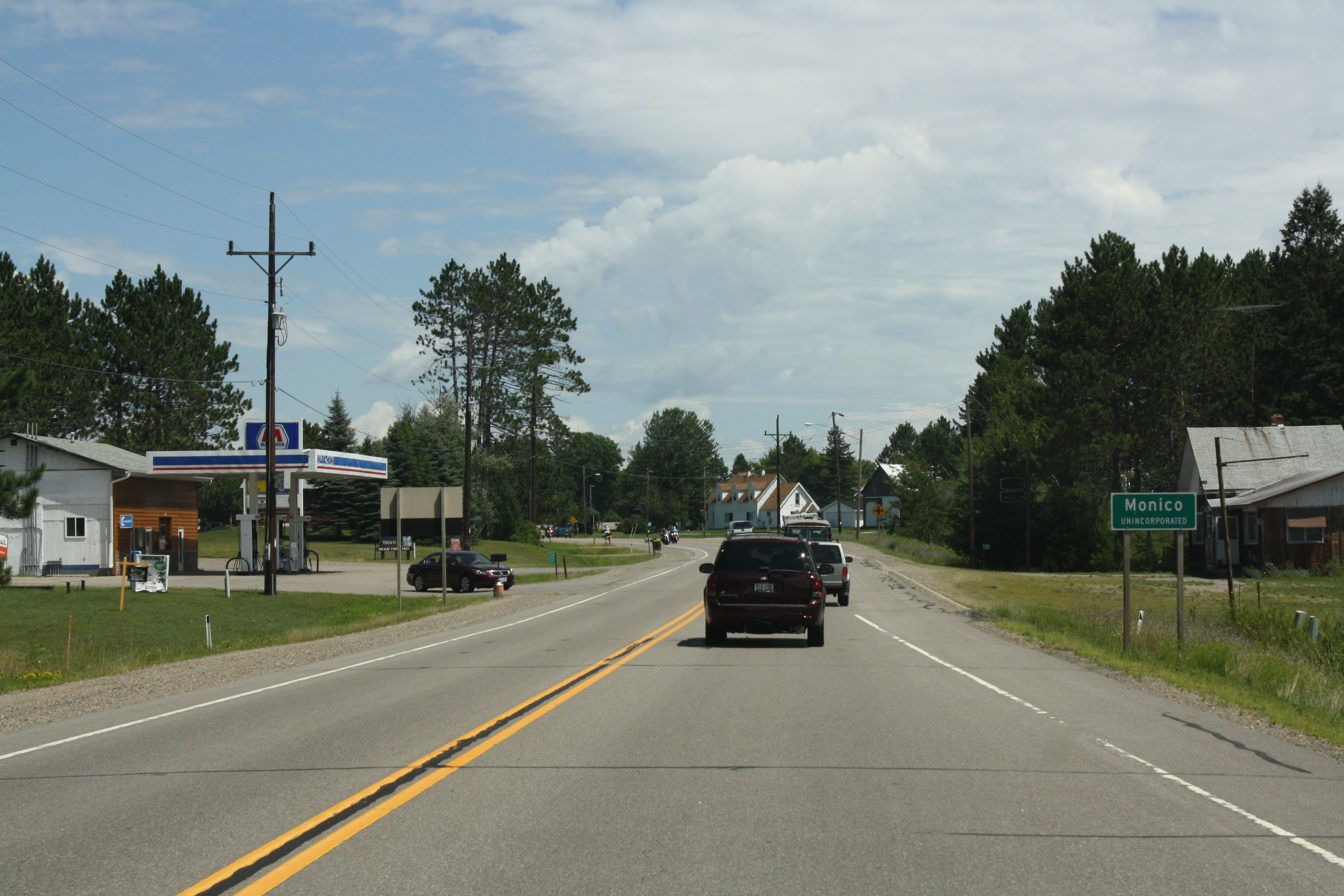
Looking east at the sign for Monico

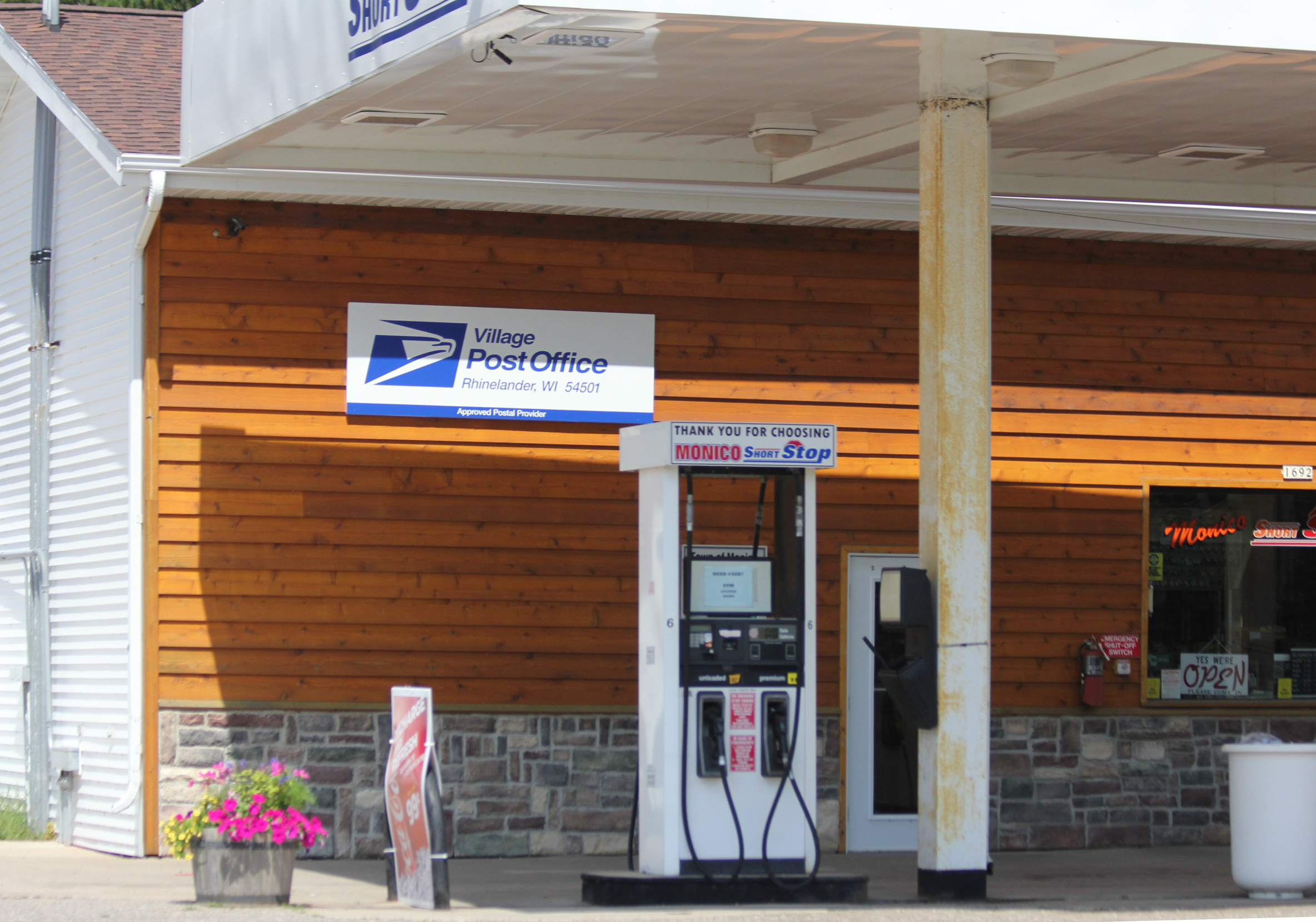
Post office
