= USFS Pelican =

U.S. fisheries vessel

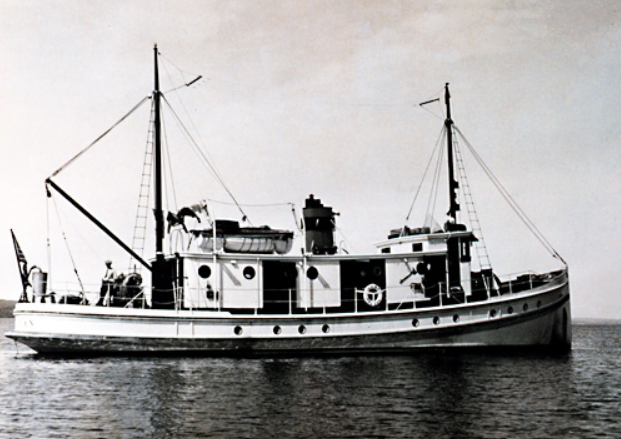
- US FWS (ex-USFS) Pelican sometime between 1940 and 1958

U.S. Bureau of Fisheries
- Name: USFS Pelican
- Namesake: Pelican, a genus of large water birds that make up the family Pelecanidae
- Builder: Boat Harbor Marine Railway, Newport News, Virginia
- Launched: 1930
- Completed: 1930
- Commissioned: 1930
- Decommissioned: 1933
- Recommissioned: 1937
- Identification: WTFJ
- Fate: Transferred to United States Fish and Wildlife Service 30 June 1940

U.S. Fish and Wildlife Service
- Name: US FWS Pelican
- Acquired: 30 June 1940
- Fate: Loaned to Washington Department of Fish and Wildlife 1958

United States
- Name: Pelican
- Namesake: Previous name retained
- Operator: Washington Department of Fish and Wildlife
- Acquired: 1958
- Fate: Returned to National Marine Fisheries Service 1970 or 1971

National Oceanic and Atmospheric Administration
- Name: NOAAS Pelican
- Namesake: Previous name retained
- Operator: National Marine Fisheries Service
- Acquired: 1970 or 1971
- Fate: Sold 1972

United States
- Name: Pelican
- Namesake: Previous name retained
- Owner: Mr. & Mrs. Walt Masland (1972– ? ); Patrick Burns and John Sylvester (as of 2018)
- Acquired: 1972
- Status: Extant 2018

General characteristics (as fishery patrol vessel)
- Type: Fishery patrol vessel
- Tonnage: 94 GRT; 39 NRT
- Length: 78 ft (23.8 m)
- Beam: 10 ft 3 in (3.1 m)
- Draft: 5 ft (1.5 m)
- Propulsion: As built: 1 x 150 hp (110 kW) six-cylinder direct-reversible Winton diesel engine; ca. 1947–1948: 1 x 200-horsepower (150 kW) six-cylinder direct-reversing Joshua Hendy Iron Works diesel engine; Between 1958–1970: 1 x 200-horsepower (150 kW) six-cylinder direct-reversing Joshua Hendy Iron Works diesel engine (same model; replaced 1947–1948 engine)
- Speed: 1947–1948: 10 knots (19 km/h; 12 mph) (maximum); 8.5 knots (15.7 km/h; 9.8 mph) (cruising)

USFS Pelican was an American fisheries science research ship and fishery patrol vessel that operated along the United States East Coast and the United States Gulf Coast and in the waters of the Territory of Alaska. She was part of the United States Bureau of Fisheries (BOF) fleet from 1930 to 1940. She then served as US FWS Pelican in the fleet of the Fish and Wildlife Service – which in 1956 became the United States Fish and Wildlife Service – from 1940 to 1958. She served as a fishery patrol vessel while on loan to the Washington Department of Fish and Wildlife from 1958 to 1970, then briefly returned to the Fish and Wildlife Service's successor agency, the National Marine Fisheries Service. Her United States Government service ended when she was sold into private hands in 1972, and she remained extant as of 2018.

== Bureau of Fisheries ==
=== Construction and characteristics ===
Seattle, Washington, naval architect Harold Cornelius Hanson designed a number of vessels for the U.S. Bureau of Fisheries, and Pelican was among them. He designed her to meet a BOF requirement for a research vessel which could conduct scientific work on the continental shelf along the United States East Coast at depths of up to 600 feet (183 m). The resulting design was nearly identical to that of the BOF fishery patrol vessel USFS Teal – which Hanson also designed and which had joined the BOF fleet in 1927 – except for a 6-foot (1.8 m) extension to the after portion of her deckhouse to accommodate an on-board fisheries science laboratory. Her deckhouse also housed the captain′s room, a radio room, and the crew's mess; the captain's room included a chart table. Some of the deckhouse compartments were separated from one another, with self-sealing, high-threshold doors to her outer side decks providing access between them. She was of heavily planked construction; the planks were made of U.S. East Coast longleaf yellow pine on a white oak frame with Douglas fir decking. Her 150-horsepower (112 kW) six-cylinder direct-reversible Winton diesel engine was mounted on four 12-by-20-inch (30 by 51 cm) wooden timbers. An air compressor started the engine.

Boat Harbor Marine Railway in Newport News, Virginia, constructed Pelican and launched her in 1930. She quickly completed fitting-out and was commissioned into service with the BOF fleet the same year.

=== Operational history ===
Upon commissioning in 1930, Pelican proceeded immediately to Boothbay Harbor, Maine, where she replaced the BOF vessel USFS Gannet in performing fish culture work at the BOF's Boothbay Harbor station. She spent most of 1932 supporting a special International Passamaquoddy Fisheries Commission study of the potential for the construction of proposed power dams in Cobscook Bay and Passamaquoddy Bay on the coast of Maine to harm the area's food fish populations. She completed that work on 17 October 1932, and in 1933 took part in fishery studies in the Atlantic Ocean off the coast of Maine. She was taken out of service later in 1933.

While out of service, Pelican underwent overhaul and modifications, including a major overhaul of her engine at Portland, Maine. After her engine overhaul was complete, Pelican underwent repairs and alterations at Fairhaven, Massachusetts, in 1936, including the installation of deck fittings, a 25-kilowatt (34 hp) electric generator, and a hydrographic winch with 5,000 feet (1,524 m) of steel cable for oceanographic work.

Pelican returned to service in 1937, departing Fairhaven on 10 January 1937 bound for a new assignment in the Gulf of Mexico. Along the way, she stopped at the United States Coast Guard Yard at Curtis Bay in Baltimore, Maryland, where the United States Coast Guard provided her with a radio and an electric generator to power it, which Coast Guard personnel installed aboard her. She then moved on to Brunswick, Georgia, where she arrived on 22 January 1937. There she received additional minor alterations and took aboard fishing gear and hydrographic equipment. She departed Brunswick on 30 January 1937 bound for New Orleans, Louisiana.

Although her small size limited her to operations within 100 nautical miles (190 km; 120 mi) of the United States Gulf Coast and precluded lengthy stays at sea, Pelican arrived at New Orleans well equipped for deep-water hydrographic and biological surveys thanks to the work performed on her at Fairhaven, Curtis Bay, and Brunswick. She set to work in 1937 on an investigation of shrimp populations in the Gulf of Mexico, which she continued until 1940. She operated all along the U.S. Gulf Coast from Florida to Texas during these years, using exploratory offshore trawling, plankton hauls, and analyses of seawater salinity and geological bottom core samples to develop a scientific understanding of shrimp biology in the hope of establishing a viable commercial shrimp fishery in the Gulf of Mexico that could make up for declining shrimp populations in the Atlantic Ocean. Searching for evidence to support a theory that shrimp move to deeper waters in the winter after disappearing in the autumn from fishing grounds closer to shore, Pelican found brown shrimp (Farfantepenaeus aztecus) in deeper water off the coast of Louisiana in 1938; this discovery allowed the development of a viable commercial shrimp-fishing industry in the Gulf of Mexico. By early 1940, she had expanded her shrimp investigation into the Atlantic Ocean off the southeastern United States, conducting shrimp surveys along the coast between Florida and North Carolina.

== Fish and Wildlife Service ==
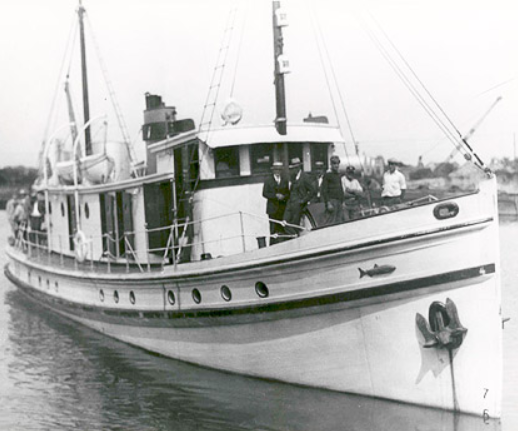
US FWS Pelican sometime in 1948 or 1950

In 1939, the BOF was transferred from the United States Department of Commerce to the United States Department of the Interior, and on 30 June 1940, it merged with the Interior Department's Division of Biological Survey to form the new Fish and Wildlife Service (FWS), The vessel thus became part of the FWS fleet as US FWS Pelican.

In early 1941, Pelican was loaded aboard the United States Navy cargo ship USS Vega at Newport News. Vega transported her to Puget Sound in Washington, delivering her there at the end of April 1941. After undergoing an overhaul, she proceeded to the Territory of Alaska for service as an FWS fishery patrol vessel. In addition to patrol duties, she often serviced FWS trap and stream watchmen – temporary FWS employees in Southcentral and Southeast Alaska who patrolled important fishing grounds and maintained lights and free-floating fish traps – with supplies. In late 1941, she towed the FWS fishery patrol vessel USFS Eider, which had suffered damage when she ran aground on 24 October 1941 – from Prince Rupert, British Columbia, Canada, to Seattle, Washington, for repairs.

During World War II, the United States Army took control of Pelican, basing her at Seward, Territory of Alaska, in 1943–1944 and using her to transport personnel and supplies to lookout stations on Montague Island in the Gulf of Alaska. During this period, her material condition declined and she often required repairs and maintenance.

Pelican returned to FWS control after World War II. While she was in Seattle for an overhaul sometime around 1947 or 1948, her original engine was replaced by a 200-horsepower (149 kW) six-cylinder direct-reversing Joshua Hendy Iron Works diesel engine. Started by an air compressor, her new engine consumed about 1 US gallon (3.8 L; 0.83 imp gal) of diesel fuel per nautical mile (1.15 miles, 1.85 km) and gave her a cruising speed of 8.5 knots (15.7 km/h; 9.8 mph) and a maximum speed of 10 knots (19 km/h; 12 mph).

Under a major reorganization in 1956, the FWS became the United States Fish and Wildlife Service, and a new Bureau of Commercial Fisheries (BCF) was created as a component of the USFWS. Seagoing USFWS vessels, including Pelican, came under the control of the USFWS's new BCF. By 1957, the USFWS had based her at Juneau, Territory of Alaska, where she supported management operations.

== Washington Department of Fish and Wildlife ==
In 1958, the FWS loaned Pelican to the Washington Department of Fish and Wildlife. The State of Washington used her for fishery patrols off the Washington coast until 1970. She was Washington's largest patrol vessel and the state's first to be equipped with radar. During her years with the Washington fishery patrol fleet, her Joshua Hendy engine was replaced with another Joshua Hendy engine of the same model.

== National Marine Fisheries Service ==
On 3 October 1970, a major reorganization occurred which formed the National Oceanic and Atmospheric Administration (NOAA) under the United States Department of Commerce. As part of the reorganization, the Bureau of Commercial Fisheries was removed from the U.S. Fish and Wildlife Service, reorganized, and placed under NOAA as the new National Marine Fisheries Service (NMFS), and Pelican thus came under NMFS control when Washington returned her to the United States Government in 1970 or 1971. At first, the major ships that were to form the new NOAA fleet – seagoing ships of the BCF fleet and those which formerly made up the fleet of the United States Coast and Geodetic Survey, which had been disestablished upon the creation of NOAA – reported to separate entities, with former Coast and Geodetic Survey ships subordinate to the National Ocean Survey (the Coast and Geodetic Survey's successor organization within NOAA), while former BCF ships like Pelican reported to the BCF's successor within NOAA, the NMFS. Although the ships were resubordinated during 1972 and 1973 to form the unified NOAA fleet, this change still lay in the future when NOAA sold Pelican into private ownership in 1972, bringing her U.S. Government career to an end.

== Later career ==
In 1972, Mr. and Mrs. Walt Masland purchased Pelican from NOAA for about US$16,000 in a sealed-bid auction at Seattle. Pelican had only 800 operating hours on her engine at the time of her sale. Over at least the next 38 years, the Maslands spent thousands of man-hours on restoring Pelican to nearly her original condition and to maintain her in that condition. As of 2010, Pelican's home port was Port Angeles, Washington, the Maslands still owned her, and her Joshua Hendy engine still provided her propulsion.

Later, Captain Patrick Burns and Captain John "Johnny" Sylvester purchased Pelican from Marilyn Masland. As of 2018, Pelican′s home port was Deer Harbor, Washington. In 2018, she made a voyage up the Inside Passage from Washington to Alaska and returned to Washington.
