= Pelican Lake (Wisconsin) =

Lake in Oneida County, Wisconsin, United States

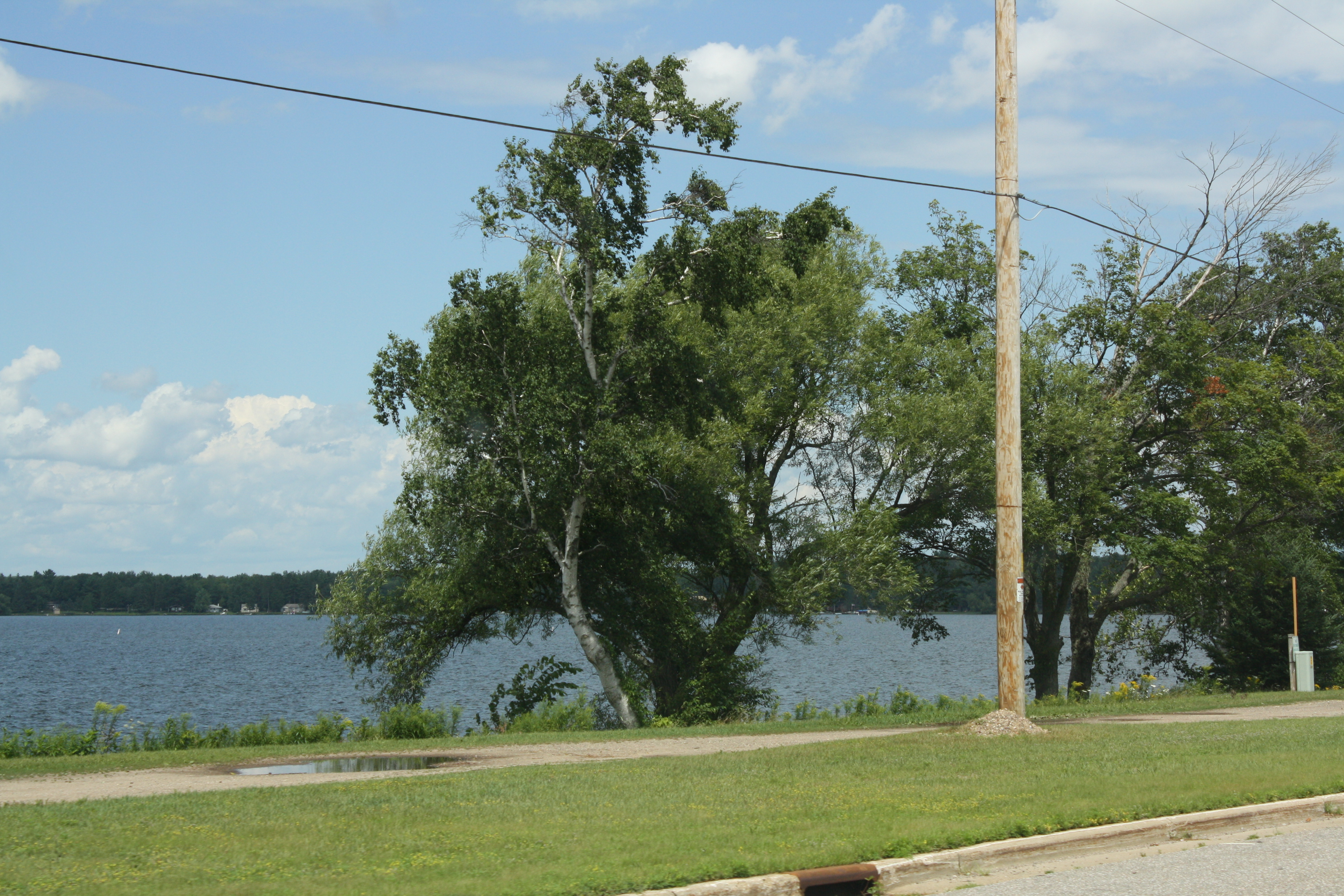
- Looking northwest at Pelican Lake

- Location within Wisconsin Location within the United States
- Location: Oneida County, Wisconsin
- Coordinates: 45.504127°N 89.203453°W
- Type: Drainage
- Primary outflows: Pelican River
- Catchment area: Pelican River Watershed, Upper Wisconsin Basin
- Basin countries: United States
- Surface area: 3,585 acres (14.51 km^{2})
- Max. depth: 39 ft (12 m)
- Water volume: 2.175 billion cubic feet (61.6×10^{6} m^{3})
- Shore length^{1}: 13 mi (21 km)
- Surface elevation: 1,591 ft (485 m)
- ^{1} Shore length is not a well-defined measure.

Pelican Lake is a 3,585-acre (14.51 km^{2}) lake located in Oneida County in Wisconsin. It has a maximum depth of 39 ft (12 m). Visitors have access to the lake from five public boat landings. A dam is located on the lake's primary outlet, which feeds into the Pelican River. Pelican Lake serves as one of 21 reservoirs used to regulate and maintain optimal water flow on the Wisconsin and Tomahawk rivers, the process of which is facilitated in part by the Wisconsin Valley Improvement Company.

Fish inhabiting the lake include muskie, panfish, largemouth bass, smallmouth bass, northern pike and walleye. The lake's water clarity has historically been low, and its bottom composition is 40% sand, 20% gravel, 10% rock, 30% muck. The lake is eutrophic. Several invasive species are or have been found in the lake, including banded mystery snail, Chinese mystery snail, curly-leaf pondweed, Eurasian water-milfoil, purple loosestrife, and rusty crayfish.

Pelican Lake was named for the American white pelicans seen there.
