= Newbold =

Newbold may refer to:

== Places ==
- Newbold, New South Wales, Australia, in Clarence Valley Council

=== United Kingdom ===
- Newbold, Derbyshire, England
  - Newbold Community School
- Newbold, Rochdale, a location in Greater Manchester, England
- Newbold, Harborough, in Owston and Newbold, Leicestershire, England
- Newbold, North West Leicestershire, England
  - Newbold tram stop, Rochdale, England
- Newbold-on-Avon, Rugby, Warwickshire, England
  - Newbold Quarry Park
- Newbold on Stour, Warwickshire, England

=== United States ===
- Newbold, Wisconsin, a town
  - Newbold (community), Wisconsin, an unincorporated community
- Newbold, Philadelphia, Pennsylvania, a former alternative name for a section of South Philadelphia, Pennsylvania, United States

== Other uses ==
- Newbold (name), a list of people with the surname or given name
- Newbold College, a Seventh-day Adventist private school in Binfield, Berkshire, England

== See also ==
- Newbold Astbury, Cheshire, England
- Newbold Pacey, Warwickshire, England
- Newbold Verdon, Leicestershire, England
- Newbold Comyn, a park in Leamington Spa
- Newbolds Corner, New Jersey
- Newbald
- Newbolt
