= Nokomis, Wisconsin =

- Town
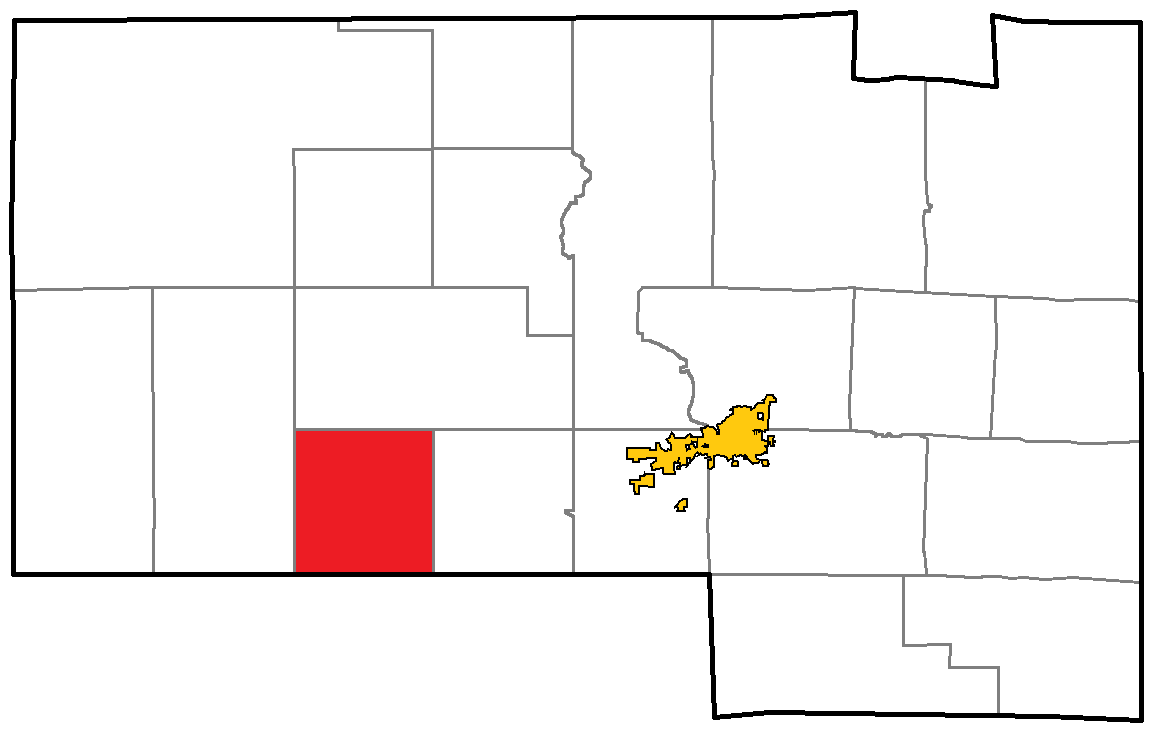
- Location of Nokomis, within Oneida County
- Coordinates: 45°34′49″N 89°43′56″W
- Country: United States
- State: Wisconsin
- County: Oneida

Area
  - Total: 37.0 sq mi (95.8 km^{2})
  - Land: 33.4 sq mi (86.5 km^{2})
  - Water: 3.6 sq mi (9.3 km^{2})
- Elevation: 1,503 ft (458 m)

Population (2020)
  - Total: 1,372
  - Density: 41.1/sq mi (15.9/km^{2})
- Time zone: UTC-6 (Central (CST))
  - Summer (DST): UTC-5 (CDT)
- Area codes: 715 & 534
- FIPS code: 55-57450
- GNIS feature ID: 1583822
- Website: https://www.nokomiswi.gov/

Nokomis is a town in Oneida County, Wisconsin, United States. The population was 1,372 at the 2020 census.

== Geography ==
According to the United States Census Bureau, the township has a total area of 37.0 square miles (95.8 km^{2}), of which 33.4 square miles (86.5 km^{2}) is land and 3.6 square miles (9.3 km^{2}) (9.76%) is water.

== Demographics ==
At the 2010 census, there were 1,371 people, 556 households and 433 families residing in the town.

At the 2000 census, there were 1,363 people, 556 households, and 433 families. The population density was 40.8 per square mile (15.8/km^{2}). There were 1,013 housing units at an average density of 30.3 per square mile (11.7/km^{2}). The racial makeup of the town was 99.27% White, 0.15% Native American, 0.07% Asian, and 0.51% from two or more races. Hispanic or Latino people of any race were 0.37% of the population.

There were 556 households, of which 28.6% had children under the age of 18 living with them, 69.2% were married couples living together, 5.0% had a female householder with no husband present, and 22.1% were non-families. 18.2% of all households were made up of individuals, and 7.7% had someone living alone who was 65 years of age or older. The average household size was 2.45 and the average family size was 2.77.

22.7% of the population were under the age of 18, 3.7% from 18 to 24, 27.6% from 25 to 44, 28.8% from 45 to 64, and 17.2% who were 65 years of age or older. The median age was 42 years. For every 100 females, there were 99.6 males. For every 100 females age 18 and over, there were 100.2 males.

The median household income was $43,000 and the median family income was $47,813. Males had a median income of $36,563 and females $22,446. The per capita income was $19,171. About 4.8% of families and 6.3% of the population were below the poverty line, including 7.0% of those under age 18 and 7.3% of those age 65 or over.

== Transportation ==
The Rhinelander-Oneida County Airport (KRHI) serves Nokomis, the county and surrounding communities with both scheduled commercial jet service and general aviation services.
