= Lennox, Wisconsin =

- Unincorporated community
- Location within Wisconsin Location within the United States
- Coordinates: 45°30′43″N 89°04′18″W
- Country: United States
- State: Wisconsin
- County: Oneida
- Elevation: 1,621 ft (494 m)
- Time zone: UTC-6 (Central (CST))
  - Summer (DST): UTC-5 (CDT)
- Area codes: 715 & 534
- GNIS feature ID: 1577697

Lennox is an unincorporated community located in the town of Schoepke, Oneida County, Wisconsin, United States. Lennox is located on County Highway B, 18.5 miles (29.8 km) east-southeast of Rhinelander. Lennox is located just north of the unincorporated community of Jennings. The community is named after Lenox, Massachusetts, which took its name from Charles Lennox, 1st Duke of Richmond.
