= Fred Piehl =

Local Business Figure

Fred Piehl

Frederick H. Piehl (May 16, 1880 in Seymour, Wisconsin – February 16, 1939 in Rhinelander, Wisconsin) was a public figure and businessman in Oneida County, Wisconsin. Piehl was a member of the county board of supervisors for 11 years.

Piehl was a member of Rhinelander's first city council under the city manager form of government. As a member of the county board, he represented the fourth ward of the city. He was the chairman of the audit and towns and villages committees of the board, and was a member of the forestry and conservation committee.

He operated the Gagen Land and Cedar company in Piehl, Wisconsin and the Northern Cedar and Lumber Company.

Logging train
