= Pine Lake, Wisconsin =

- Town
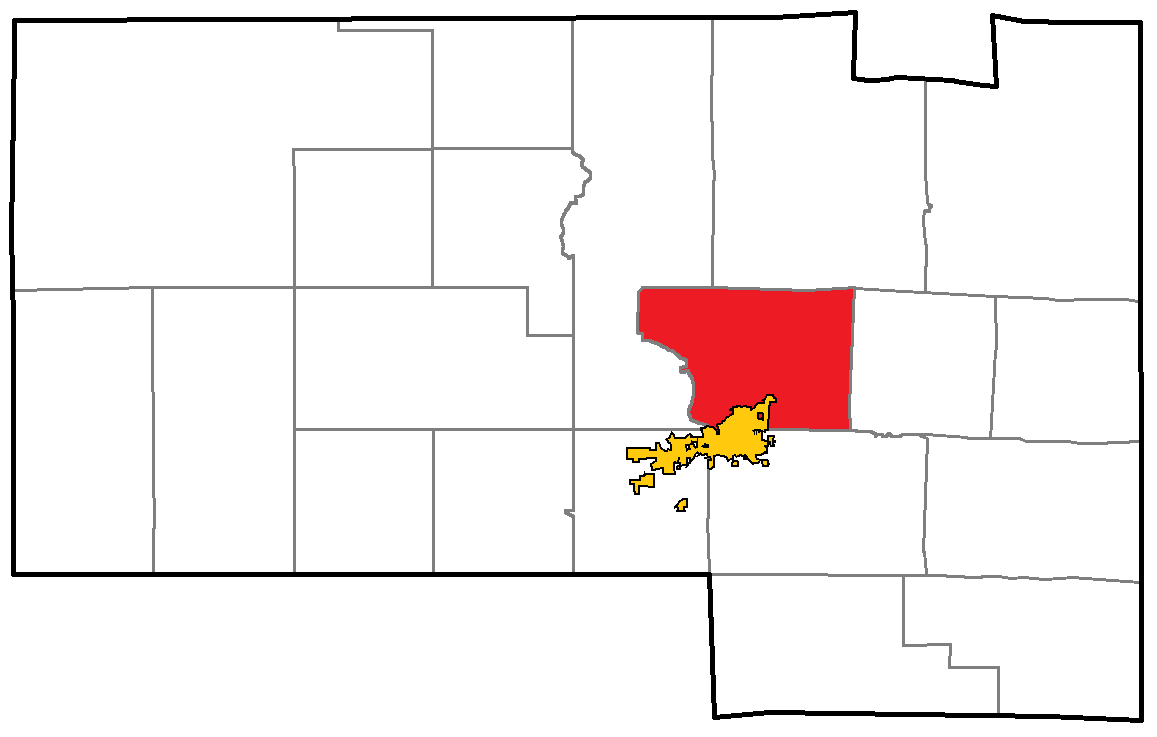
- Location of Pine Lake, within Oneida County
- Coordinates: 45°41′36″N 89°23′06″W
- Country: United States
- State: Wisconsin
- County: Oneida

Area
  - Total: 45.0 sq mi (116.6 km^{2})
  - Land: 40.6 sq mi (105.2 km^{2})
  - Water: 4.4 sq mi (11.4 km^{2})
- Elevation: 1,624 ft (495 m)

Population (2020)
  - Total: 2,724
  - Density: 67.06/sq mi (25.89/km^{2})
- Time zone: UTC-6 (Central (CST))
  - Summer (DST): UTC-5 (CDT)
- Area codes: 715 & 534
- FIPS code: 55-62925
- GNIS feature ID: 1583925

Pine Lake is a town in Oneida County, Wisconsin, United States. The population was 2,724 at the time of the 2020 census. The unincorporated community of Roosevelt is located in the town.

== Recreation ==
A rural, "Northwoods" forest-land, Pine Lake is home to both the Crystal Lake Scout Reservation and the annual Hodag Country Music Festival.

== Geography ==
According to the United States Census Bureau, the town has a total area of 45.0 square miles (116.6 km^{2}), of which 40.6 square miles (105.2 km^{2}) is land and 4.4 square miles (11.4 km^{2}) (9.80%) is water.

== Demographics ==
As of the census of 2000, there were 2,720 people, 1,063 households, and 755 families residing in the town. The population density was 67.0 people per square mile (25.9/km^{2}). There were 1,381 housing units at an average density of 34.0 per square mile (13.1/km^{2}). The racial makeup of the town was 97.46% White, 0.96% African American, 0.74% Native American, 0.33% Asian, 0.11% from other races, and 0.40% from two or more races. Hispanic or Latino of any race were 0.59% of the population.

There were 1,063 households, out of which 29.4% had children under the age of 18 living with them, 61.7% were married couples living together, 6.3% had a female householder with no husband present, and 28.9% were non-families. 23.0% of all households were made up of individuals, and 8.7% had someone living alone who was 65 years of age or older. The average household size was 2.45 and the average family size was 2.88.

In the town, the population was spread out, with 22.6% under the age of 18, 7.3% from 18 to 24, 29.0% from 25 to 44, 28.9% from 45 to 64, and 12.1% who were 65 years of age or older. The median age was 40 years. For every 100 females, there were 109.7 males. For every 100 females age 18 and over, there were 111.0 males.

The median income for a household in the town was $43,750, and the median income for a family was $49,500. Males had a median income of $36,413 versus $23,272 for females. The per capita income for the town was $21,515. About 4.2% of families and 7.4% of the population were below the poverty line, including 11.2% of those under age 18 and 10.7% of those age 65 or over.

== Government ==
Name	Position
Jim Flory	Chairman
Cindy Skinner	Clerk
Jake Nitzel	Constable

== Transportation ==
The Rhinelander–Oneida County Airport (KRHI) serves Pine Lake, the county and surrounding communities with both scheduled commercial jet service and general aviation services.
