= Pelican, Wisconsin =

- Town
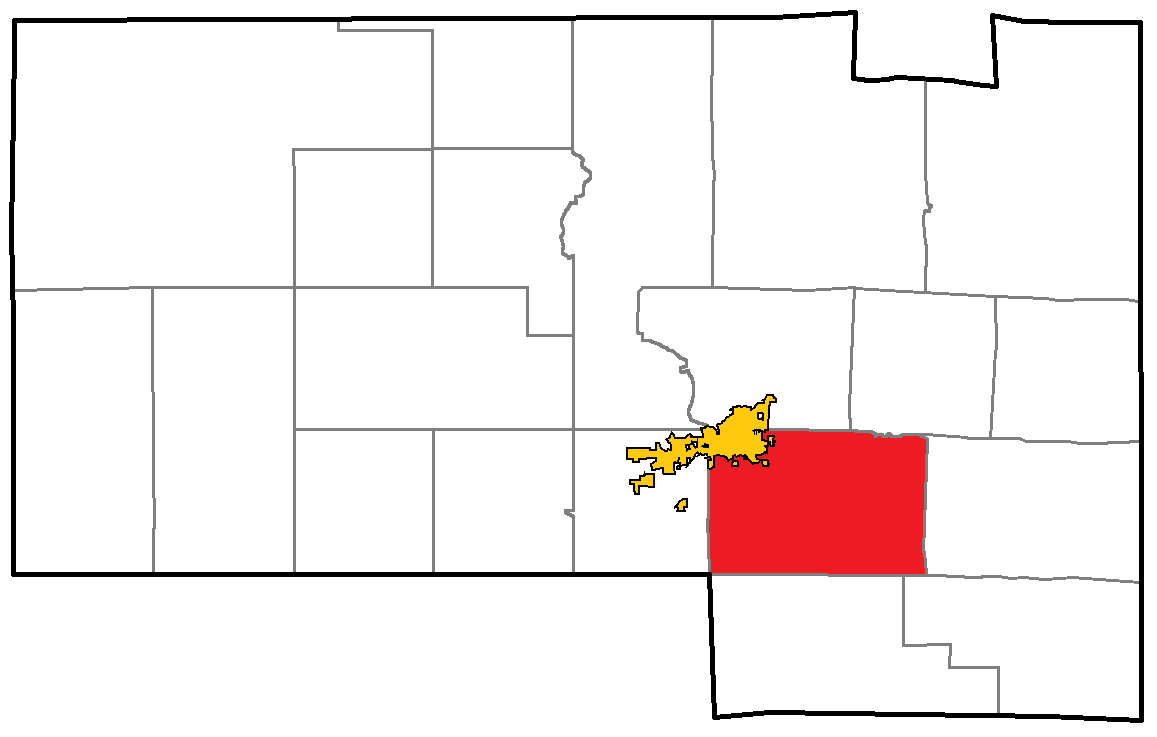
- Location of Pelican, within Oneida County
- Coordinates: 45°36′37″N 89°21′29″W
- Country: United States
- State: Wisconsin
- County: Oneida

Area
  - Total: 54.1 sq mi (140.2 km^{2})
  - Land: 51.5 sq mi (133.3 km^{2})
  - Water: 2.7 sq mi (7.0 km^{2})
- Elevation: 1,570 ft (480 m)

Population (2020)
  - Total: 2,809
  - Density: 54.58/sq mi (21.07/km^{2})
- Time zone: UTC-6 (Central (CST))
  - Summer (DST): UTC-5 (CDT)
- Area codes: 715 & 534
- FIPS code: 55-61625
- GNIS feature ID: 1583903
- Website: https://www.townofpelican.com/

Pelican is a town in Oneida County, Wisconsin, United States. The population was 2,809 at the 2020 census. The unincorporated community of Malvern is located in the town. The town took its name from Pelican Lake.

== Geography ==
According to the United States Census Bureau, the town has a total area of 54.2 square miles (140.2 km^{2}), of which 51.5 square miles (133.3 km^{2}) is land and 2.7 square miles (7.0 km^{2}) (4.99%) is water.

=== Climate ===
Climate data for North Pelican, Wisconsin, 1991–2020 normals, 1950-2020 extremes: 1610ft (491m)
Month	Jan	Feb	Mar	Apr	May	Jun	Jul	Aug	Sep	Oct	Nov	Dec	Year
Record high °F (°C)	51 (11)	58 (14)	75 (24)	88 (31)	92 (33)	97 (36)	98 (37)	97 (36)	93 (34)	86 (30)	72 (22)	58 (14)	98 (37)
Mean maximum °F (°C)	40.5 (4.7)	48.1 (8.9)	60.3 (15.7)	77.2 (25.1)	83.2 (28.4)	86.6 (30.3)	87.4 (30.8)	86.1 (30.1)	81.6 (27.6)	74.1 (23.4)	55.1 (12.8)	43.6 (6.4)	89.9 (32.2)
Mean daily maximum °F (°C)	20.9 (−6.2)	26.5 (−3.1)	38.2 (3.4)	51.8 (11.0)	65.7 (18.7)	73.9 (23.3)	76.8 (24.9)	74.5 (23.6)	65.8 (18.8)	53.0 (11.7)	36.6 (2.6)	25.2 (−3.8)	50.7 (10.4)
Daily mean °F (°C)	12.2 (−11.0)	15.3 (−9.3)	26.3 (−3.2)	39.5 (4.2)	51.8 (11.0)	60.8 (16.0)	64.3 (17.9)	62.9 (17.2)	55.0 (12.8)	43.7 (6.5)	29.6 (−1.3)	17.3 (−8.2)	39.9 (4.4)
Mean daily minimum °F (°C)	3.5 (−15.8)	4.2 (−15.4)	14.3 (−9.8)	27.2 (−2.7)	37.9 (3.3)	47.6 (8.7)	51.8 (11.0)	51.4 (10.8)	44.3 (6.8)	34.4 (1.3)	22.5 (−5.3)	9.3 (−12.6)	29.0 (−1.6)
Mean minimum °F (°C)	−25.6 (−32.0)	−24.5 (−31.4)	−15.3 (−26.3)	7.0 (−13.9)	22.8 (−5.1)	32.7 (0.4)	37.3 (2.9)	35.5 (1.9)	27.4 (−2.6)	17.0 (−8.3)	0.6 (−17.4)	−17.2 (−27.3)	−28.8 (−33.8)
Record low °F (°C)	−46 (−43)	−48 (−44)	−40 (−40)	−8 (−22)	15 (−9)	25 (−4)	28 (−2)	29 (−2)	19 (−7)	4 (−16)	−17 (−27)	−35 (−37)	−48 (−44)
Average precipitation inches (mm)	1.20 (30)	1.00 (25)	1.68 (43)	2.64 (67)	3.32 (84)	3.84 (98)	4.67 (119)	3.18 (81)	3.96 (101)	3.18 (81)	2.15 (55)	1.41 (36)	32.23 (820)
Average snowfall inches (cm)	14.4 (37)	9.8 (25)	10.4 (26)	5.1 (13)	0.2 (0.51)	0.0 (0.0)	0.0 (0.0)	0.0 (0.0)	0.0 (0.0)	1.0 (2.5)	8.2 (21)	12.1 (31)	61.2 (156.01)
Source 1: NOAA (1981-2010 precipitation)
Source 2: XMACIS (1991-2004 snowfall, temp records & monthly max/mins)

== Demographics ==
As of the census of 2000, there were 2,902 people, 1,167 households, and 820 families residing in the town. The population density was 56.4 people per square mile (21.8/km^{2}). There were 1,532 housing units at an average density of 29.8 per square mile (11.5/km^{2}). The racial makeup of the town was 98.07% White, 0.28% Native American, 0.52% Asian, 0.03% Pacific Islander, 0.03% from other races, and 1.07% from two or more races. Hispanic or Latino of any race were 0.31% of the population.

There were 1,167 households, out of which 31.3% had children under the age of 18 living with them, 59.6% were married couples living together, 6.9% had a female householder with no husband present, and 29.7% were non-families. 25.1% of all households were made up of individuals, and 10.6% had someone living alone who was 65 years of age or older. The average household size was 2.49 and the average family size was 2.97.

In the town, the population was spread out, with 25.2% under the age of 18, 5.7% from 18 to 24, 28.8% from 25 to 44, 26.8% from 45 to 64, and 13.5% who were 65 years of age or older. The median age was 40 years. For every 100 females, there were 104.2 males. For every 100 females age 18 and over, there were 99.4 males.

The median income for a household in the town was $36,053, and the median income for a family was $44,423. Males had a median income of $38,169 versus $20,861 for females. The per capita income for the town was $18,566. About 5.3% of families and 6.2% of the population were below the poverty line, including 5.7% of those under age 18 and 3.1% of those age 65 or over.

== Transportation ==
The Rhinelander-Oneida County Airport (KRHI) serves Pelican, the county and surrounding communities with both scheduled commercial jet service and general aviation services.
