= Schoepke, Wisconsin =

- Town
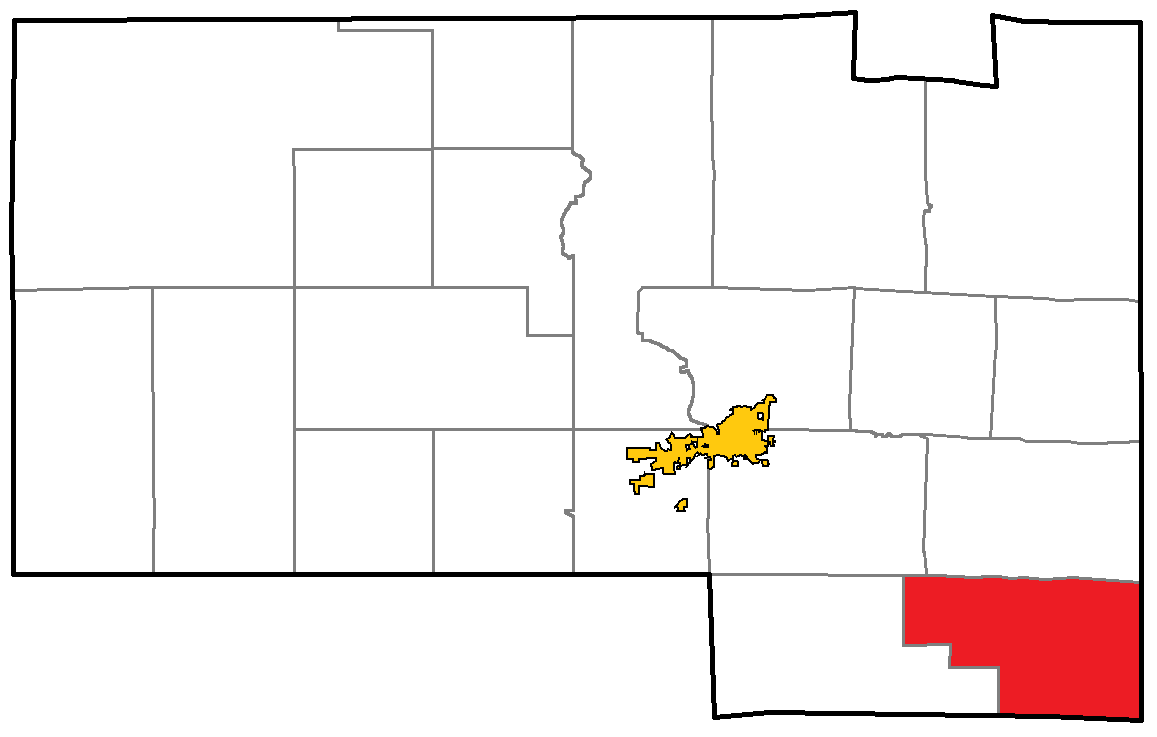
- Location of Schoepke, within Oneida County
- Coordinates: 45°30′46″N 89°8′46″W
- Country: United States
- State: Wisconsin
- County: Oneida

Area
  - Total: 50.6 sq mi (131.0 km^{2})
  - Land: 46.1 sq mi (119.3 km^{2})
  - Water: 4.5 sq mi (11.7 km^{2})
- Elevation: 1,598 ft (487 m)

Population (2020)
  - Total: 388
  - Density: 8.42/sq mi (3.25/km^{2})
- Time zone: UTC-6 (Central (CST))
  - Summer (DST): UTC-5 (CDT)
- Area codes: 715 & 534
- FIPS code: 55-72125
- GNIS feature ID: 1584111

Schoepke is a town in Oneida County, Wisconsin, United States. The population was 388 at the 2020 census. The unincorporated communities of Jennings, Lennox, Pelican Lake, and Pratt Junction are located in the town.

== Geography ==
According to the United States Census Bureau, the town has a total area of 50.6 square miles (131.0 km^{2}), of which 46.0 square miles (119.3 km^{2}) is land, while 4.5 square miles (11.7 km^{2}) or (8.96%) is water.

== Demographics ==
As of the census in 2000, there were 352 people, 156 households, and 107 families residing in the town. The population density was 7.6 people per square mile (3.0/km^{2}). There were 626 housing units at an average density of 13.6 per square mile (5.2/km^{2}). The racial makeup of the town was 98.30% White, 0.28% Native American, and 1.42% from two or more races.

There were 156 households, out of which 21.2% had children under the age of 18 living with them, 59.0% were married couples living together, 7.1% had a female householder with no husband present, and 31.4% were non-families. 26.9% of all households were made up of individuals, and 15.4% had someone living alone who was 65 years of age or older. The average household size was 2.26 and the average family size was 2.73.

In the town, the population was spread out, with 18.2% under the age of 18, 5.4% from 18 to 24, 23.3% from 25 to 44, 27.8% from 45 to 64, and 25.3% who were 65 years of age or older. The median age was 47 years. For every 100 females, there were 112.0 males. For every 100 females age 18 and over, there were 104.3 males.

The median income for a household in the town was $28,929, and the median income for a family was $29,286. Males had a median income of $23,750 versus $18,125 for females. The per capita income for the town was $20,134. About 6.9% of families and 8.7% of the population were below the poverty line, including 13.3% of those under age 18 and 9.8% of those age 65 or over.

== Transportation ==
The Rhinelander-Oneida County Airport (KRHI) serves Schoepke, the county and surrounding communities with both scheduled commercial jet service and general aviation services.
