= Piehl, Wisconsin =

- Town
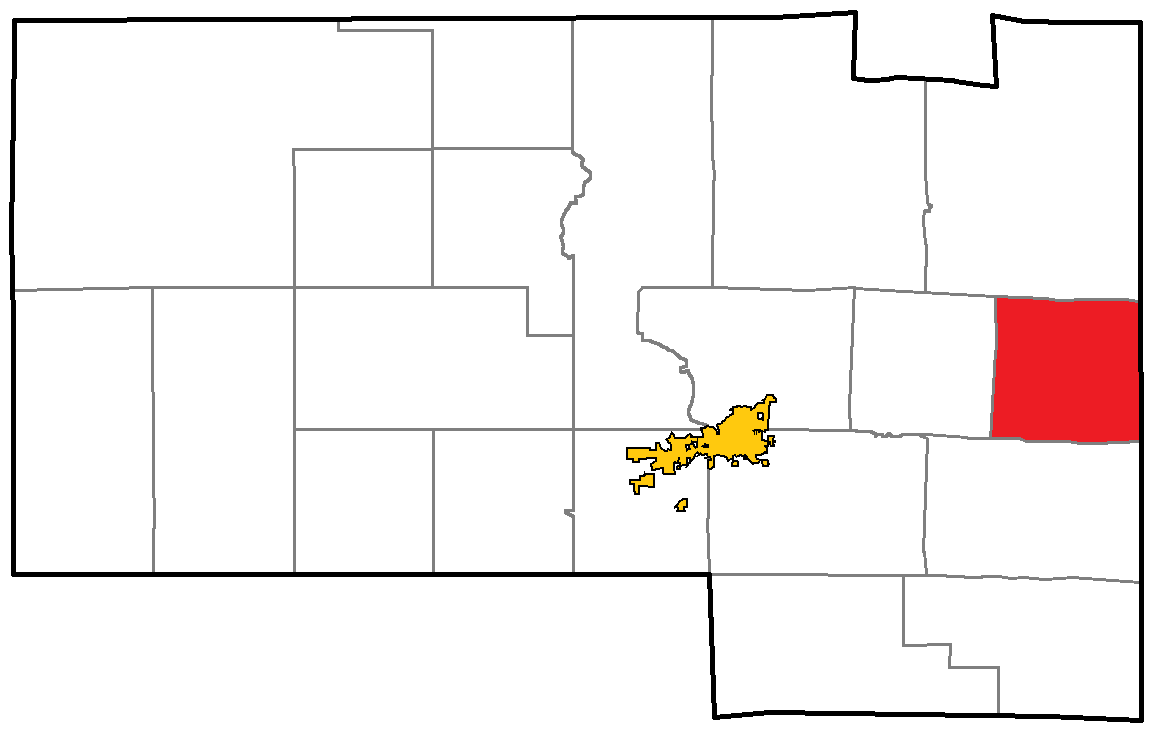
- Location of Piehl, within Oneida County
- Coordinates: 45°40′24″N 89°7′45″W
- Country: United States
- State: Wisconsin
- County: Oneida

Area
  - Total: 38.0 sq mi (98.4 km^{2})
  - Land: 37.4 sq mi (96.8 km^{2})
  - Water: 0.58 sq mi (1.5 km^{2})
- Elevation: 1,660 ft (506 m)

Population (2020)
  - Total: 74
  - Density: 2.0/sq mi (0.76/km^{2})
- Time zone: UTC-6 (Central (CST))
  - Summer (DST): UTC-5 (CDT)
- Area codes: 715 & 534
- FIPS code: 55-62600
- GNIS feature ID: 1583919

Piehl is a town in Oneida County, Wisconsin, United States. The population was 74 at the 2020 census. The unincorporated community of Gagen is located in the town.

== Geography ==
According to the United States Census Bureau, the town has a total area of 38.0 square miles (98.4 km^{2}), of which 37.4 square miles (96.8 km^{2}) is land and 0.6 square mile (1.5 km^{2}) (1.55%) is water.

== Demographics ==
As of the census of 2000, there were 93 people, 39 households, and 26 families residing in the town. The population density was 2.5 people per square mile (1.0/km^{2}). There were 85 housing units at an average density of 2.3 per square mile (0.9/km^{2}). The racial makeup of the town was 98.92% White, 1.08% from other races. Hispanic or Latino of any race were 1.08% of the population.

There were 39 households, out of which 30.8% had children under the age of 18 living with them, 56.4% were married couples living together, 5.1% had a female householder with no husband present, and 33.3% were non-families. 28.2% of all households were made up of individuals, and 5.1% had someone living alone who was 65 years of age or older. The average household size was 2.38 and the average family size was 2.96.

In the town, the population was spread out, with 20.4% under the age of 18, 6.5% from 18 to 24, 32.3% from 25 to 44, 30.1% from 45 to 64, and 10.8% who were 65 years of age or older. The median age was 42 years. For every 100 females, there were 106.7 males. For every 100 females age 18 and over, there were 100.0 males.

The median income for a household in the town was $31,500, and the median income for a family was $36,250. Males had a median income of $31,250 versus $11,250 for females. The per capita income for the town was $13,101. There were no families and 4.2% of the population living below the poverty line, including no under eighteens and none of those over 64.

== History ==
Home to Gagen Land & Cedar Company around 1900, the primary industries of Piehl were farming and lumber. White cedar posts and poles, piling, railroad ties and pulp wood were produced. The owner of Gagen Land & Cedar Company was Fred Piehl. March 25, 1908, the town of Piehl was created to consist of Township 37 north of Range 11 east, detached from the towns of Three Lakes and Monico. The picture shows a sample of the lumberjacks that worked for the Gagen Land & Cedar Company.

Lumberjacks in Gagen

== Transportation ==
The Rhinelander-Oneida County Airport (KRHI) serves Piehl, the county and surrounding communities with both scheduled commercial jet service and general aviation services.
