= Enterprise, Wisconsin =

- Town
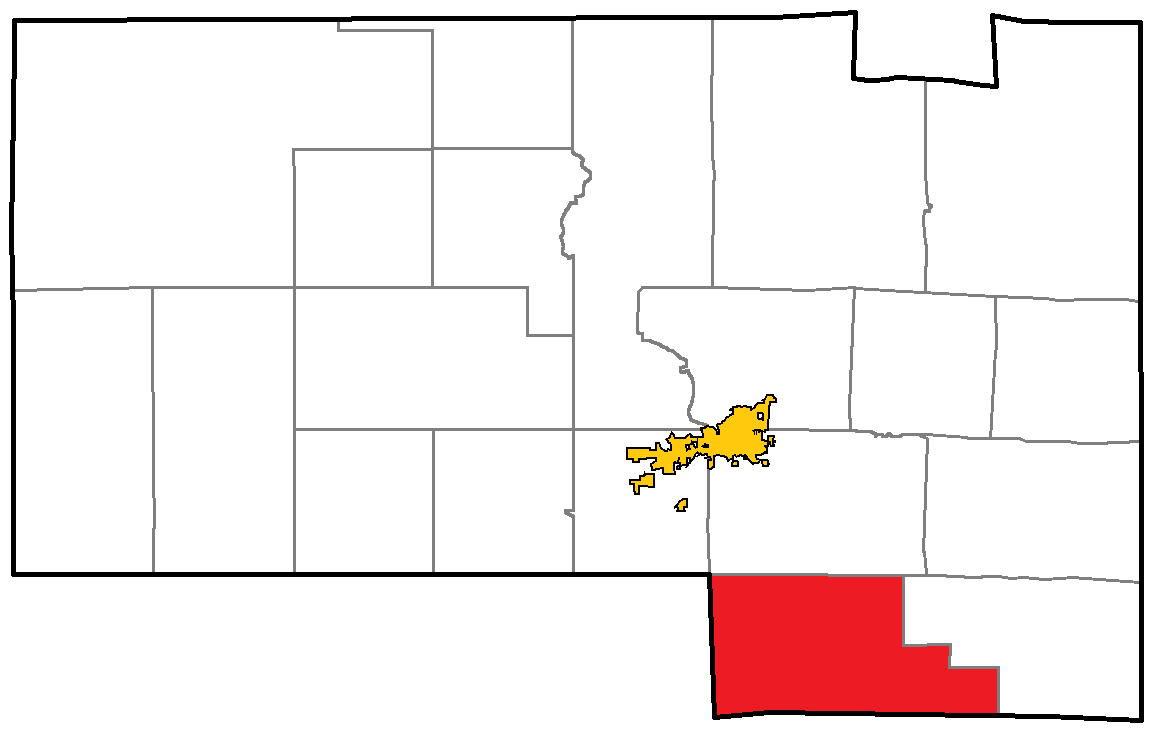
- Location of Enterprise, within Oneida County
- Coordinates: 45°30′59″N 89°19′48″W
- Country: United States
- State: Wisconsin
- County: Oneida

Area
  - Total: 58.9 sq mi (152.6 km^{2})
  - Land: 56.7 sq mi (146.8 km^{2})
  - Water: 2.2 sq mi (5.8 km^{2})
- Elevation: 1,627 ft (496 m)

Population (2020)
  - Total: 353
  - Density: 6.23/sq mi (2.40/km^{2})
- Time zone: UTC-6 (Central (CST))
  - Summer (DST): UTC-5 (CDT)
- Area codes: 715 & 534
- FIPS code: 55-24125
- GNIS feature ID: 1583169

Enterprise is a town in Oneida County, Wisconsin, United States. The population was 353 at the 2020 census. The unincorporated community of Enterprise is located in the town.

== Geography ==
According to the United States Census Bureau, the town has a total area of 58.9 square miles (152.6 km^{2}), of which 56.7 square miles (146.8 km^{2}) is land and 2.2 square miles (5.8 km^{2}) (3.80%) is water.

== Demographics ==
As of the census of 2000, there were 274 people, 124 households, and 90 families residing in the town. The population density was 4.8 people per square mile (1.9/km^{2}). There were 386 housing units at an average density of 6.8 per square mile (2.6/km^{2}). The racial makeup of the town was 100.00% White. Hispanic or Latino of any race were 0.36% of the population.

There were 124 households, out of which 20.2% had children under the age of 18 living with them, 65.3% were married couples living together, 3.2% had a female householder with no husband present, and 27.4% were non-families. 22.6% of all households were made up of individuals, and 7.3% had someone living alone who was 65 years of age or older. The average household size was 2.21 and the average family size was 2.59.

In the town, the population was spread out, with 17.5% under the age of 18, 3.6% from 18 to 24, 29.2% from 25 to 44, 29.2% from 45 to 64, and 20.4% who were 65 years of age or older. The median age was 44 years. For every 100 females, there were 119.2 males. For every 100 females age 18 and over, there were 123.8 males.

The median income for a household in the town was $34,479, and the median income for a family was $34,531. Males had a median income of $33,125 versus $19,107 for females. The per capita income for the town was $14,970. None of the families and 1.9% of the population were living below the poverty line, including no under eighteens and 4.7% of those over 64.

== Transportation ==
The Rhinelander-Oneida County Airport (KRHI) serves Enterprise, the county and surrounding communities with both scheduled commercial jet service and general aviation services.
