= Pratt Junction, Wisconsin =

- Unincorporated community
- Location within Wisconsin Location within the United States
- Coordinates: 45°28′57″N 89°09′52″W
- Country: United States
- State: Wisconsin
- County: Oneida
- Elevation: 1,601 ft (488 m)
- Time zone: UTC-6 (Central (CST))
  - Summer (DST): UTC-5 (CDT)
- Area codes: 715 & 534
- GNIS feature ID: 1577778

Pratt Junction is an unincorporated community located in the town of Schoepke, Oneida County, Wisconsin, United States. Pratt Junction is 1 mile (1.6 km) south of Pelican Lake and 16 miles (26 km) southeast of Rhinelander.
