= Tom Doyle Lake =

Lake in Wisconsin, United States

- Location within Wisconsin Location within the United States
- Location: Oneida County, Wisconsin
- Coordinates: 45.7640603°N 89.4932926°W
- Surface area: 108 acres (44 ha)
- Max. depth: 30 feet (9.1 m)
- Surface elevation: 1,581 feet (482 m)
- Settlements: Newbold

Tom Doyle Lake is a lake located in Newbold, within Oneida County, Wisconsin. The lake is 108 acres in size with a maximum depth of 30 feet.
