= List of killings by law enforcement officers in the United States, January 2024 =

This is a list of people reported killed by non-military law enforcement officers in the United States in January 2024, whether in the line of duty or not, and regardless of reason or method. The listing documents the occurrence of a death, making no implications regarding wrongdoing or justification on the part of the person killed or officer involved. Killings are arranged by date of the incident that caused death. Different death dates, if known, are noted in the description. The table below lists 103 people.

== January 2024 ==
Date	Name (age) of deceased	Race	Location	Description
2024-01-31	Craig Anglisano (43)	White	Spokane, Washington	Spokane Police received a report of a man armed with a gun, later identified as Anglisano. Officers ordered him to drop the gun but he pointed at the officers, at which point they opened fire, shot and killed him.
2024-01-30	Richard Rogissart (55)	White	Spokane, Washington	Police responded to a man threatening to kill his neighbor with a baton. They did not arrest the suspect due to his uncooperative nature and the lightness of potential charges, but later came back after the neighbor reported the suspect was trespassing. The suspect engaged in a standoff with police that ended in the suspect allegedly advancing toward officers, who fired shots, killing the suspect. A police dog and a deputy were injured.
2024-01-30	Tevin Chatman (28)	Black	Springfield, Tennessee	Police responding to a shooting and stolen vehicle found the vehicle crashed. A man at the scene allegedly brandished a handgun and fired shots at officers, who returned fire, fatally shooting the suspect.
2024-01-30	Kenneth Ellis (52)	White	Fryeburg, Maine	Ellis led New Hampshire police officers into Maine during a car chase before crashing. He allegedly exited his vehicle with a knife and was shot dead by an officer.
2024-01-30	Chad Hartley (23)	White	Temple, Texas	A suicidal man allegedly brandished a handgun at officers, causing an officer to fire one round, fatally wounding the suspect.
2024-01-30	Artell Cunningham (28)	Black	New Carrollton, Maryland	Two officers shot and killed a man suspected of multiple carjackings and two homicides.
2024-01-29	John Robert Smith (58)	Black	Decatur, Georgia	Smith allegedly brandished a knife at a veterans' affairs hospital and threatened to harm himself. He was shot dead by an officer as he reportedly advanced towards medical personnel with his weapon.
2024-01-29	unidentified male (43)	White	Peoria, Arizona	Police responded to a man acting suspiciously at a restaurant. The man fled encroaching officers and was shot and killed after he brandished a gun at them.
2024-01-29	Michael James Yanacheak (75)	White	Willmar, Minnesota	As a deputy attempted to enforce a court-ordered eviction, Yanacheack got out of his home with a knife. The deputy shocked him with a taser.
2024-01-28	unidentified male (35)	Unknown	Fife Lake, Michigan	Police responded to a domestic assault call. During the encounter, the suspect fled into a wooded area. The suspect was armed and police shot him after a confrontation.
2024-01-28	Tyler Lebron Roberts (31)	Black	Ooltewah, Tennessee	Roberts allegedly kidnapped his 18-month-old child in Ringgold, Georgia, before fleeing to Tennessee by car. His car was disabled with a spike strip, and he reportedly exchanged gunfire with officers, resulting in his death.
2024-01-28	Brandon Kapas (24)	White	Palm Bay, Florida	Kapas shot and killed three people and wounded two police officers. Other officers killed him.
2024-01-27	Joshua Nugent (36)	White	Evergreen, Louisiana	Police were reported of a man destroying property, later identified as Nugent. LSP said that he barricaded himself in his home and presented a firearm. They confronted in a shooting which resulted in his death.
2024-01-27	Guy Robert Vogel Jr. (42)	White	Phoenix, Arizona	Police say the Vogel stole guns from a nearby pawn shop with a woman. After trying to carjack a truck, he was shot.
2024-01-27	Christopher Michael Fraijo (51)	White	Colorado Springs, Colorado	EPSO Police found Fraijo with a gun. After non-compliance, a shootout occurred, which resulted in his death.
2024-01-26	Robert Lee Campbell (51)	White	Piedmont, South Carolina	During the investigation of a homicide, SLED found Campbell in the site. Gunfire was exchanged. He died in the hospital.
2024-01-26	India F. Watson (47)	Black	San Antonio, Texas	
2024-01-26	Vinton Miller (29)	Black	Olympic Valley, California	Miller, on a work visa from Jamaica, refused to stop for California State Parks Police, who suspected his car was stolen. Miller crashed his car following a pursuit, and was shot dead by police after exiting his vehicle with a knife.
2024-01-26	Albaro Amaral (33)	Unknown	Susanville, California	
2024-01-26	Alexander Spencer (28)	Black	Philadelphia, Pennsylvania	
2024-01-25	Brandan Shae Maroney (35)	Black	Waianae, Hawaii	
2024-01-25	Luwi Conrad Edmeade (41)	Black	Greenfield, Indiana	
2024-01-25	Joseph Baca (38)	Hispanic	Albuquerque, New Mexico	
2024-01-25	Larry Armour (43)	Black	Wichita, Kansas	
2024-01-25	Raphael Nafees Dekemper (48)	White	Indianapolis, Indiana	
2024-01-24	Clifford Brooks (41)	Black	Washington, D.C.	During a mental health call Brooks was transported by ambulance to the hospital. On the way there he allegedly assaulted medical personnel, leading the ambulances to stop. The man fled and ran into traffic, crawling under a truck. Brooks got out holding a long tire air-pressure gauge, and an officer shot him.
2024-01-24	Jeremiah Gaver (37)	White	Boise, Idaho	
2024-01-24	Shamar Legette (41)	Black	South Brunswick, New Jersey	Legette was wanted by U.S. Marshals for his involvement in the robbery of Brooklyn-based pastor Lamor Whitehead during a live-streamed church service. Legette was tracked to an inn in New Jersey, where Marshals shot him after a scuffle. Marshals recovered two firearms near Legette.
2024-01-24	James Ryan Jr (45)	White	Elko, Nevada	
2024-01-24	unidentified male (44)	Unknown	Bluffdale, Utah	
2024-01-24	unidentified male	Unknown	Lakewood, Washington	
2024-01-24	Austyn Joseph "A.J." Cousins (26)	White	Pittsburgh, Pennsylvania	Police responding to shots fired shot a man, who later died at hospital.
2024-01-23	John Garcia (46)	Unknown	San Antonio, Texas	Police responded to a call and found a deceased woman, 48-year-old Lisa Ortiz. Garcia allegedly returned the scene of the crime and rammed police cars before firing a shotgun at officers. Several officers returned fire and killed Garcia.
2024-01-23	Derk A. Brachmann	Unknown	Appleton, Wisconsin	Brachmann was fatally shot after they allegedly fired on police responding to a weapons complaint at a bar.
2024-01-22	Janet Sours (81)	White	Wildwood, Florida	Sours called police to request personnel arrive at her residence. When police came, she allegedly attacked an officer with a knife and was fatally shot.
2024-01-22	Daniel Martinez (43)	Hispanic	Eureka, California	
2024-01-21	Liban S. Mohamed (22)	Unknown	Augusta, Maine	
2024-01-21	Brett Shanahan (40)	White	Gilbert, Arizona	
2024-01-21	Heath Thompson (40)	White	Nashua, New Hampshire	
2024-01-20	Steven Kincaid (33)	White	Crescent, Wisconsin	
2024-01-20	Shane William Sims (33)	White	Winston-Salem, North Carolina	
2024-01-19	Alex Menhenett (43)	White	Whitehall, Ohio	An auxiliary police officer working security responded to a report that Menhenett was attempting to shoplift from a Walmart, though Menhenett stated he was attempting to use the self-checkout. The officer attempted to arrest Menhenett, using a leg sweep that caused Menhenett to hit his head on the ground. Menhenett was hospitalized and died five days later.
2024-01-18	Jervon Jervy Harper (42)	Black	San Antonio, Texas	Harper died after he was fatally shot by SAPD officer Officer Edgardo Valladares during a traffic stop.
2024-01-18	Gary Solomon (31)	Black	Norfolk, Virginia	
2024-01-18	Robert James Perkins (36)	Unknown	Cleveland, Ohio	
2024-01-18	Alejandro Avalos (46)	Hispanic	Bakersfield, California	
2024-01-17	Christopher Lynn Bailey (52)	White	Miami, Florida	
2024-01-17	Lawrence Packard (73)	Unknown	Philadelphia, Pennsylvania	
2024-01-17	Gary Whitten (36)	White	Landrum, South Carolina	After killing his mother and partner, a standoff between Whitten and Greenville County Sheriff deputies occurred. 26 minutes later, Whitten stepped outside and point a shower head at police and being shot. He was pronounce deceased at the scene.
2024-01-14	Matthew Holland (31)	Unknown	Portland, Oregon	
2024-01-14	Jeffery Shane Hunt (35)	White	Hohenwald, Tennessee	Two Deputies with the Lewis County Sheriff’s Office shot a male during a traffic stop along Highway 20.
2024-01-14	Corey Faulkner (35)	White	Yakima County, Washington	
2024-01-14	Albert Alderman (33)	White	Toledo, Ohio	
2024-01-14	William Marvin Toon (28)	White	Riverdale, Utah	
2024-01-14	William Michael Fulk (66)	White	Winston-Salem, North Carolina	
2024-01-13	Wesley Gerald Klotthor (32)	Unknown	Orcutt, California	
2024-01-13	Noor Ramsis (38)	Hispanic	Los Angeles, California	
2024-01-13	Nathaniel Liberator (33)	White	Carlisle, Pennsylvania	
2024-01-12	McCrae Andrew Griffith Bowser (31)	White	Seymour, Tennessee	
2024-01-12	Jake Chiaradonna (35)	White	Manchester, New Hampshire	Police shot and killed Chiaradonna, suspected of a robbery, after he allegedly stabbed a police K-9 with a screwdriver and confronted officers with it.
2024-01-12	Brian Dawson (60)	White	Grafton, Ohio	
2024-01-12	Alfred Martinez (44)	Hispanic	Corpus Christi, Texas	
2024-01-12	Guillermo Rojas (39)	Hispanic	Monte Alto, Texas	After police tased the man and placing him under custody, the man became unresponsive and died at the hospital.
2024-01-11	Garrett Freeman (33)	White	Mulliken, Michigan	
2024-01-11	Carlos A. Rauda (46)	Hispanic	North Little Rock, Arkansas	Rauda was shot and killed after allegedly shooting at two Arkansas State Police Troopers on Interstate 40.
2024-01-11	Donald H Hibbard (49)	White	Quincy, Illinois	
2024-01-11	John Michael Lewis Jr (43)	White	Phoenix, Arizona	
2024-01-10	unidentified person	Unknown	Broomfield, Colorado	
2024-01-10	William Wilson (43)	White	Carmichael, California	
2024-01-10	Alexander Staal (51)	White	Oakland Park, Florida	
2024-01-10	Craig Cousin (41)	Black	Owings Mills, Maryland	Police responded to reports of an erratic man at a Taco Bell drive-thru. Officers, alongside Cousin's wife and step-father, restrained him, but he fell unconscious and died en route to the hospital. Although Cousin's wife said he had taken some pills, a tests for over 1200 drugs came back negative, and his death was ruled a homicide.
2024-01-09	Joseph Lee McCrackin Jr. (26)	White	Jonesboro, Arkansas	
2024-01-09	Carlos Corona (29)	Hispanic	Gresham, Oregon	
2024-01-09	Lucas Gilbertson (42)	White	East Grand Forks, Minnesota	
2024-01-09	Anthony Ray Mix (33)	White	Hemet, California	
2024-01-09	unidentified male	Unknown	Pedro, Ohio	
2024-01-09	Sha-Kim Akil Webley (29)	Unknown	Pikesville, Maryland	Police responded to a reported domestic dispute and learned the suspect, Webley, had fled to a nearby BP gas station. Following a barricade situation, three officers shot Webley after he allegedly exited through the front door and shot at officers.
2024-01-09	Rhoda Butler (61)	Black	Tacoma, Washington	
2024-01-09	Mark Lee Williams (41)	White	Lamesa, Texas	
2024-01-08	Salvador Perez-Garcia (55)	Hispanic	Sioux City, Iowa	
2024-01-08	Wyatt M. Landon (29)	White	Idaho Falls, Idaho	
2024-01-08	Jose A. Rico-Flores (24)	Hispanic	Quincy, Washington	
2024-01-07	Christopher Lee Shepherd (48)	White	Upper St. Clair Township, Pennsylvania	
2024-01-06	Aquazia Kennedy (19)	Black	Dallas, Texas	Kennedy was in the backseat of a stalled car when an off-duty officer in a Jeep Wrangler drove into it. Kennedy was killed, and her two brothers and the officer were injured. Kennedy was pregnant, and her baby was delivered following her death.
2024-01-06	Frank Glasgow (57)	Unknown	Morongo Valley, California	
2024-01-06	Micheal Mills (44)	Unknown	Leavenworth, Kansas	
2024-01-05	Kenny Estrada (35)	Hispanic	Buda, Texas	
2024-01-05	Junior Reyes (30)	Hispanic	Peoria, Arizona	Police were responding to an arrest warrant for Reyes when he pulled out a gun and opened fire on the officers, hitting one. They then engaged in a shootout, in which Reyes was mortally wounded.
2024-01-05	Jeremy Bertram (45)	White	Wayne County, Kentucky	Bertram was shot and killed after pointing a gun at two officers after they ordered him to drop it.
2024-01-05	Andre White (30)	Black	Whitehouse, Texas	Whitehouse Police responded to an apartment complex after reports of a disturbance. According to police, White started shooting at officers and was shot when an officer returned fire.
2024-01-05	Samuel Mwarey (16)	Pacific Islander	Hilo, Hawaii	Mwarey was struck by a vehicle driven by an on-duty police officer and died at the hospital.
2024-01-05	David Noteboom (43)	White	Newport News, Virginia	Noteboom was shot after he allegedly pointed a firearm at Newport News police officers coming inside his residence. Noteboom's ex-girlfriend, who was in the residence when Noteboom was shot, said Noteboom did not.
2024-01-04	Rickey Powell (43)	Black	Perry County, Mississippi	Powell fatally shot a George County Sheriff’s Office deputy while the deputy was approaching his vehicle during a traffic stop. Powell then fled the scene. After a chase, Powell was shot and killed by officers of the Mississippi Highway Patrol and George County Sheriff’s Office.
2024-01-03	Rakim A. Tillery (35)	Black	Hillburn, New York	Tillery, who was wanted for a shooting earlier in the day, was stopped by New York State Troopers on I-87. Tillery allegedly exited his vehicle and started shooting at two troopers, who shot and killed him.
2024-01-03	Eric Anthony Minix (31)	White	Lanett, Alabama	Police pursued a stolen vehicle from Georgia to Alabama. Minix, a Coweta County, Georgia Sheriff's deputy, was exiting his patrol vehicle when he was struck by a Lanett Police officer responding to assist in the chase. The officer was charged with criminally negligent homicide in September.
2024-01-01	Aaron Travis Watson (35)	White	Little Rock, Arkansas	Police pursued Watson, who was wanted by the United States Marshals Service, from Benton to Little Rock. Watson crashed after police performed a PIT maneuver on his vehicle, and officers shot him after he allegedly fired on officers.
2024-01-01	Sidney Tafokitau (44)	Pacific Islander	Honolulu, Hawaii	Tafokitau was a suspect in a shooting that injured a woman and a carjacking that followed. Police shot and killed Tafokitau near the University of Hawaii at Manoa following a shoot-out in which two officers were wounded.
2024-01-01	Michael Griffin (20)	White	Cedar Rapids, Iowa	Following a car chase involving a stolen sedan, a high-risk stop was executed. The driver of the vehicle, who had been firing at the police during and after the car chase, was found dead after five officers fired upon the stopped vehicle.
2024-01-01	Katelynn Rose Smith (29)	White	Longview, Washington	A man reporting to 911 that Smith assaulted him and was suicidal. When Longview Police arrived, Smith allegedly exited the house with a handgun in her hand and then pointed it Longview Police officers, prompting them to fatally shoot her.
2024-01-01	Rashad Lamar Nelson (30)	Black	Cottage Grove, Wisconsin	
2024-01-01	Aaron Javon Willis (30)	Black	Cottage Grove, Wisconsin	
2024-01-01	Aajayah Monai Ray (19)	Black	Cottage Grove, Wisconsin	
2024-01-01	Victor Figueroa Roblero (47)	Hispanic	Spartanburg, South Carolina	A campus officer shot and killed Roblero during a physical altercation at Spartanburg Methodist College after stopping him for driving the wrong way down a one-way street.

== See also ==
- Death in custody § United States
- Henry A. Wallace Police Crime Public Database
- List of cases of police brutality
- List of countries with annual rates and counts for killings by law enforcement officers
- List of law enforcement officers killed in the line of duty in the United States
- List of law enforcement officers convicted for an on-duty killing in the United States
- List of shootings by US immigration agents
- List of police reforms related to the George Floyd protests
- List of unarmed African Americans killed by law enforcement officers in the United States
- Lists of killings by law enforcement officers
- Police brutality in the United States
- Police misconduct § United States
- Police riot § United States
- Police use of deadly force in the United States
