= Crescent, Wisconsin =

- Town
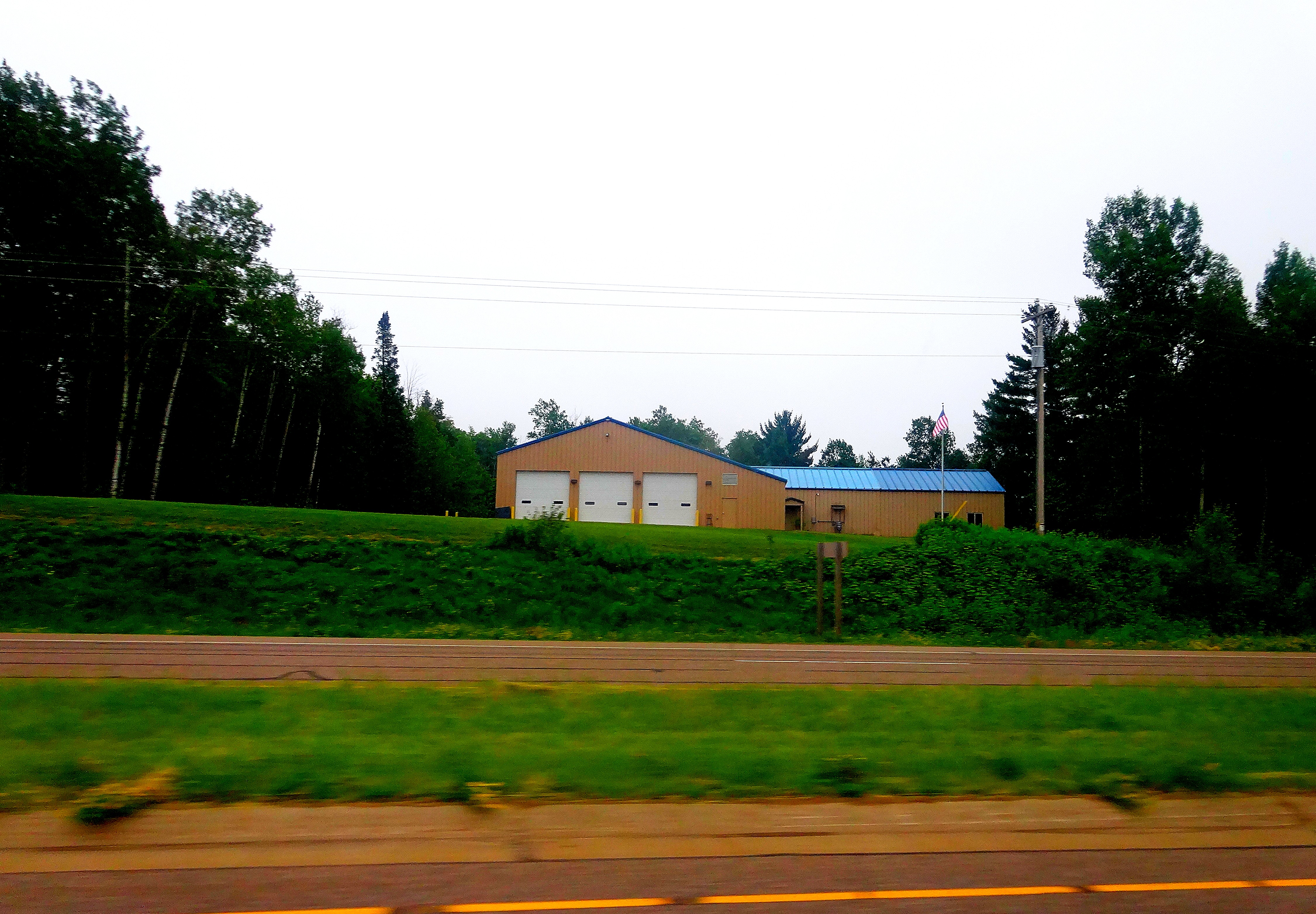
- Town hall and fire department

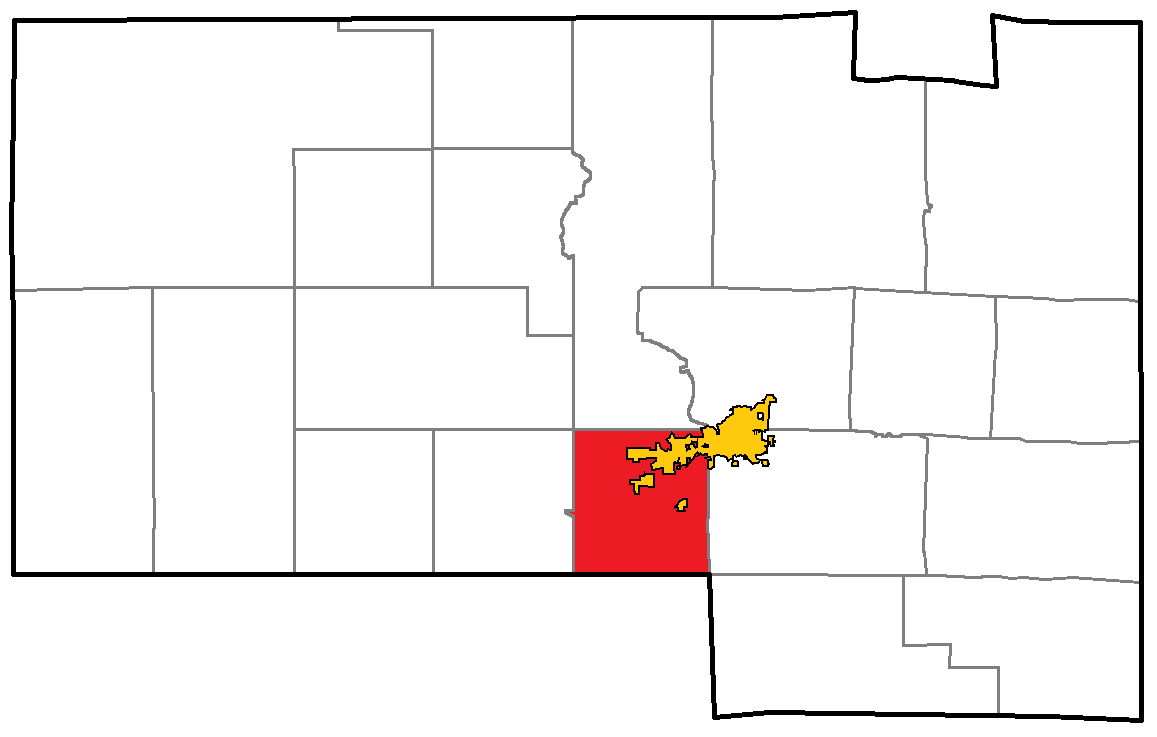
- Location of Crescent, within Oneida County
- Coordinates: 45°36′2″N 89°29′7″W
- Country: United States
- State: Wisconsin
- County: Oneida

Area
  - Total: 32.7 sq mi (84.7 km^{2})
  - Land: 29.3 sq mi (76.0 km^{2})
  - Water: 3.4 sq mi (8.7 km^{2})
- Elevation: 1,568 ft (478 m)

Population (2020)
  - Total: 1,984
  - Density: 67.6/sq mi (26.1/km^{2})
- Time zone: UTC-6 (Central (CST))
  - Summer (DST): UTC-5 (CDT)
- Area codes: 715 & 534
- FIPS code: 55-17625
- GNIS feature ID: 1583026
- Website: http://townofcrescent.com/

Crescent is a town in Oneida County, Wisconsin, United States. The population was 1,984 at the 2020 census. The unincorporated community of Crescent Corner is located in the town.

== Geography ==
According to the United States Census Bureau, the town has a total area of 32.7 square miles (84.7 km^{2}), of which 29.3 square miles (76.0 km^{2}) is land and 3.4 square miles (8.7 km^{2}) (10.30%) is water.

== Demographics ==
As of the census of 2000, there were 2,071 people, 797 households, and 608 families residing in the town. The population density was 70.6 people per square mile (27.3/km^{2}). There were 1,034 housing units at an average density of 35.2 per square mile (13.6/km^{2}). The racial makeup of the town was 98.17% White, 0.53% Native American, 0.82% Asian, and 0.48% from two or more races. Hispanic or Latino of any race were 0.34% of the population.

There were 797 households, out of which 32.9% had children under the age of 18 living with them, 65.6% were married couples living together, 6.5% had a female householder with no husband present, and 23.6% were non-families. 17.9% of all households were made up of individuals, and 5.9% had someone living alone who was 65 years of age or older. The average household size was 2.59 and the average family size was 2.95.

In the town, the population was spread out, with 25.6% under the age of 18, 5.4% from 18 to 24, 27.4% from 25 to 44, 27.7% from 45 to 64, and 13.9% who were 65 years of age or older. The median age was 40 years. For every 100 females, there were 102.0 males. For every 100 females age 18 and over, there were 98.7 males.

The median income for a household in the town was $48,875, and the median income for a family was $53,611. Males had a median income of $40,369 versus $24,934 for females. The per capita income for the town was $20,697. About 2.1% of families and 3.8% of the population were below the poverty line, including 4.7% of those under age 18 and 0.8% of those age 65 or over.

== Transportation ==
The Rhinelander-Oneida County Airport (KRHI) serves Crescent, the county and surrounding communities with both scheduled commercial jet service and general aviation services.
