= McNaughton, Wisconsin =

- Unincorporated community
- Location within Wisconsin Location within the United States
- Coordinates: 45°43′57″N 89°32′40″W
- Country: United States
- State: Wisconsin
- County: Oneida
- Elevation: 1,572 ft (479 m)
- Time zone: UTC-6 (Central (CST))
  - Summer (DST): UTC-5 (CDT)
- ZIP code: 54543
- Area codes: 715 & 534
- GNIS feature ID: 1577718

McNaughton is an unincorporated community located in Oneida County, Wisconsin, United States. McNaughton is located on Wisconsin Highway 47 northwest of Rhinelander, in the town of Newbold.

== History ==
A post office called McNaughton operated from 1890 until May 21, 2011. The community was named in honor of a local sawmill operator.
