= Newbould =

Newbould is a surname. Notable people with the name include:

- Alfred Newbould (1873–1952), British cinematographer and politician
- Brian Newbould (born 1936), British composer, conductor and author
- Frank Parkinson Newbould (1887–1951), English poster artist
- Harry Newbould (1861–1928), English football manager
- Julieanne Newbould (born 1957), Australian actress
- Thomas Newbould (1880–1964), English rugby player
- William Williamson Newbould (1819–1886), English botanist

== See also ==
- Newbold (name)
- Newbolt
