= Enterprise (community), Wisconsin =

Enterprise, Wisconsin
- Unincorporated community
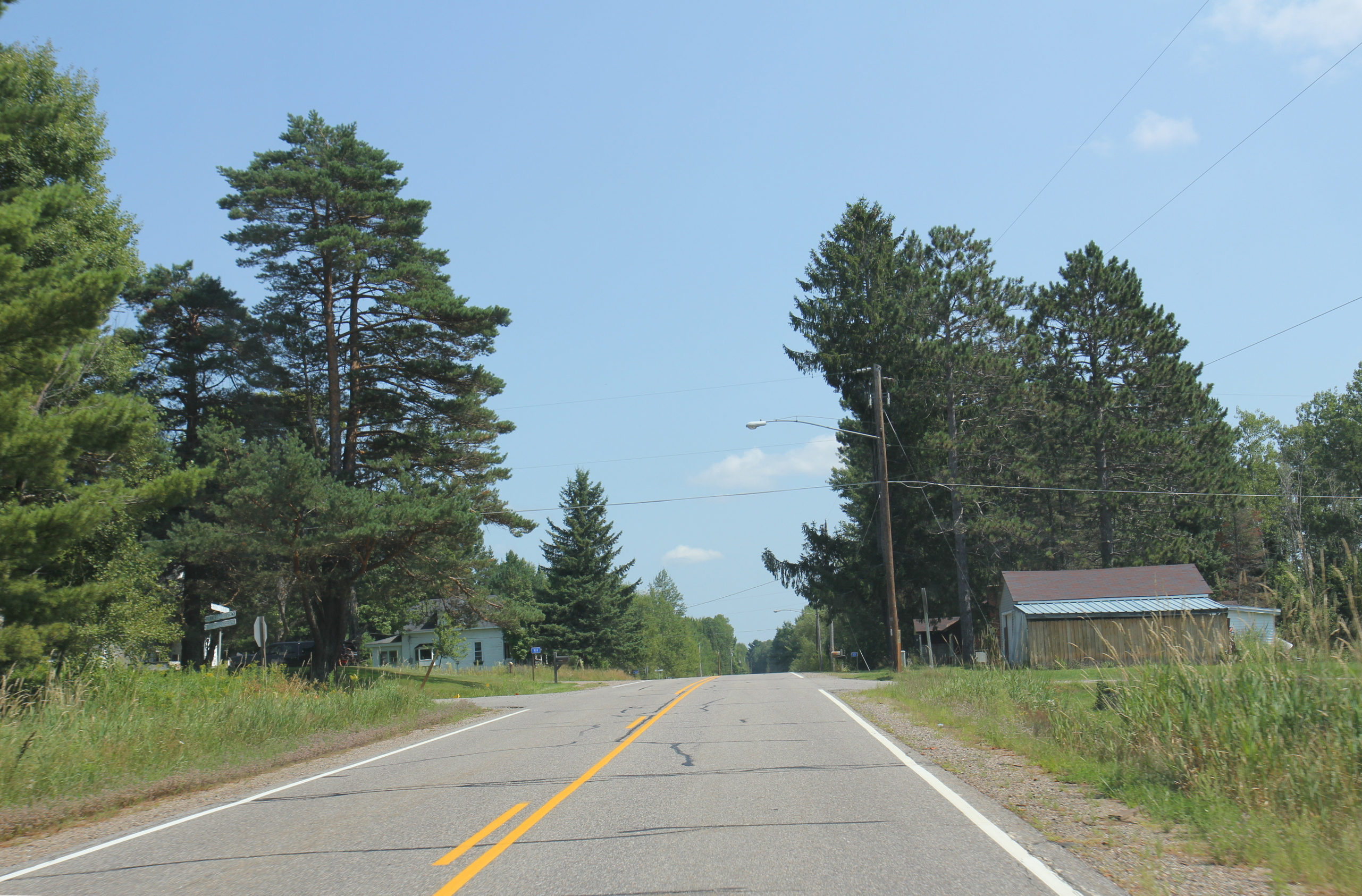
- Looking south in Enterprise

- Location within Wisconsin Location within the United States
- Coordinates: 45°29′50″N 89°15′30″W
- Country: United States
- State: Wisconsin
- County: Oneida
- Elevation: 1,627 ft (496 m)
- Time zone: UTC-6 (Central (CST))
  - Summer (DST): UTC-5 (CDT)
- Area codes: 715 & 534
- GNIS feature ID: 1564671

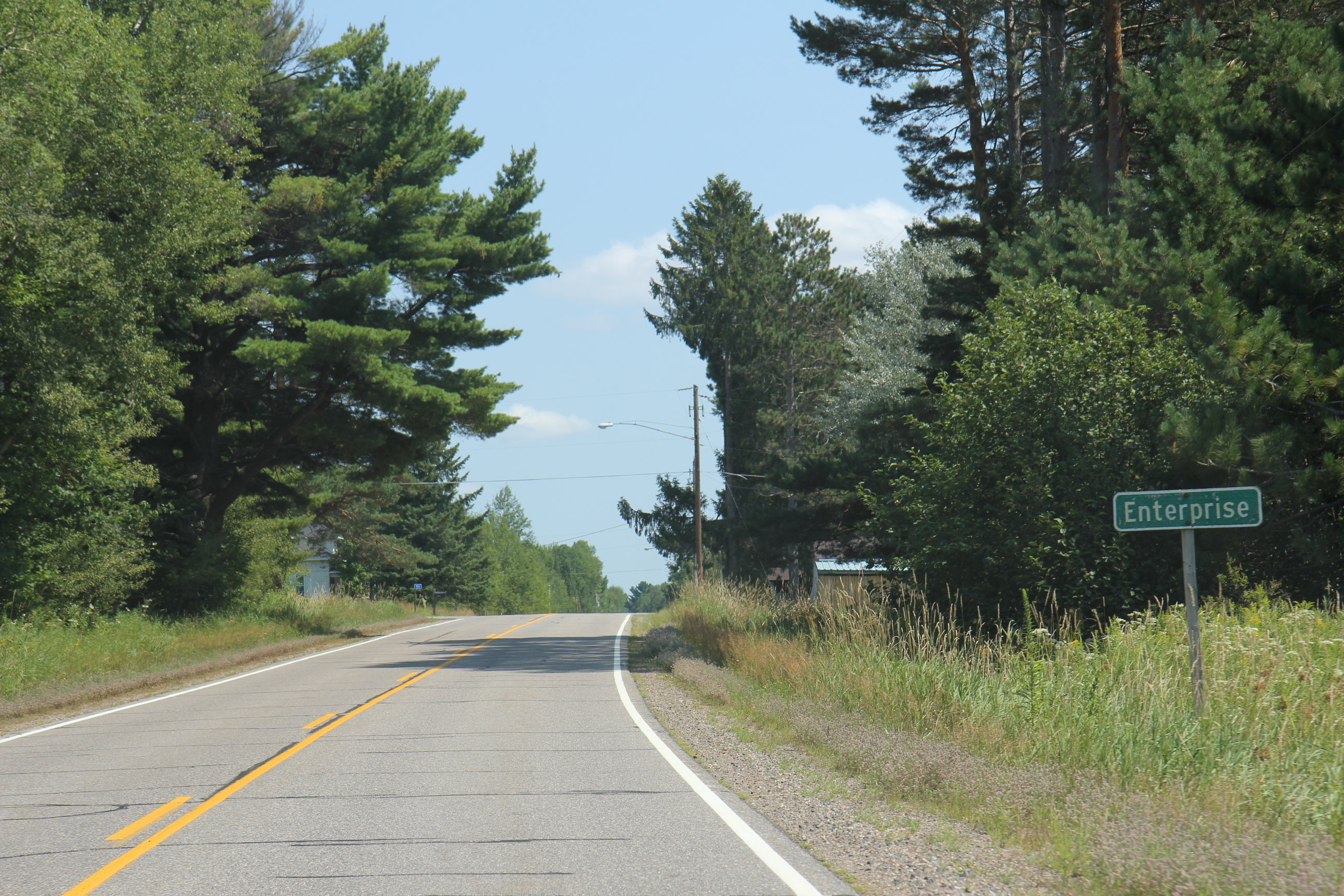
The sign for Enterprise

Enterprise is an unincorporated community located in the town of Enterprise, Oneida County, Wisconsin, United States. Enterprise is located on County Highways G and Q, 12.5 miles (20.1 km) southeast of Rhinelander.
