= Malvern, Wisconsin =

- Unincorporated community
- Location within Wisconsin Location within the United States
- Coordinates: 45°36′28″N 89°17′06″W
- Country: United States
- State: Wisconsin
- County: Oneida
- Elevation: 1,575 ft (480 m)
- Time zone: UTC-6 (Central (CST))
  - Summer (DST): UTC-5 (CDT)
- Area codes: 715 & 534
- GNIS feature ID: 1577714

Malvern is an unincorporated community located in the town of Pelican, Oneida County, Wisconsin, United States. Malvern is 6.5 miles (10.5 km) east-southeast of Rhinelander.

== History ==
Malvern was established sometime on or after October 1882, when a Milwaukee, Lake Shore and Western Railroad spur was built from Monico to Rhinelander. In June 1893, this rail line was purchased by the Chicago and North Western Railway. At about this time, a train stop with elevated platform was built just east of the intersection of the current North Pelican Lake Road and the abandoned rail line. There were also logging rail spurs/landings located in Malvern, along with several logging camps.

There were also several homes, and a tavern - of which the foundations still exist. A one room school house was built near the train stop. As the area grew in population, a larger school was built at the intersection of Haymeadow Creek and the old Highway 14 (now Haymeadow Rd). It was named the Wayside School by the school district of Rhinelander and was later relocated closer to Rhinelander and became the Pelican elementary school. It still exists and can be seen along County Highway P, near the current Pelican school complex.

One of Malvern's original settlers was a Mr. Louis C Miller, who acquired the north-west part of the NW quarter section of Section 18 via the Federal Homestead Act in 1898. His cabin was located south of the wagon road that lay south of the railroad tracks, and he cleared approximately 25 acres of land. His cabin site and land clearing rock piles exist to this day.

A post office called Malvern operated from 1902 until 1906. The name of the community commemorates the Virginia Battle of Malvern Hill.
