= Stevens Point Municipal Airport =

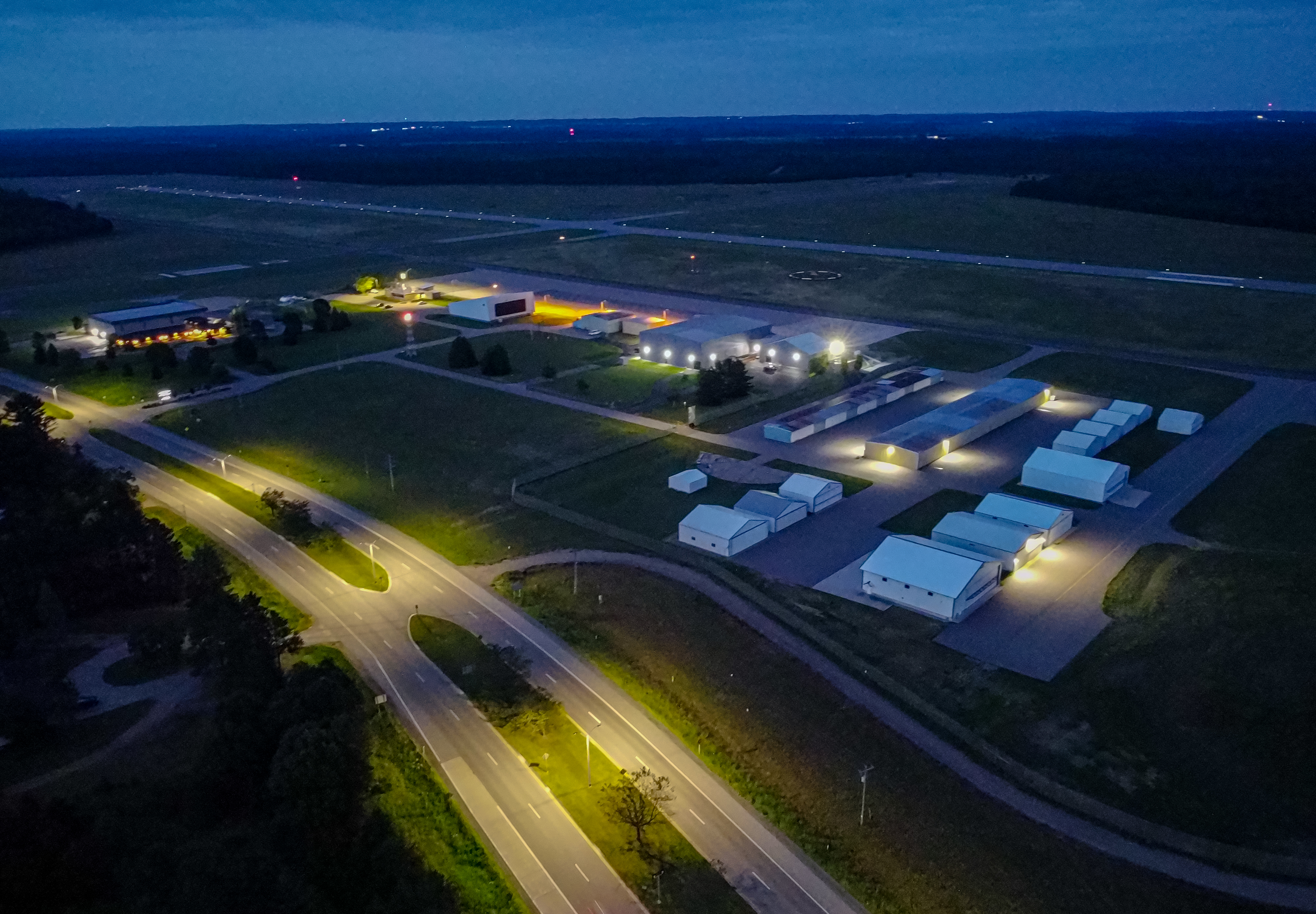
- IATA: STE; ICAO: KSTE; FAA LID: STE

Summary
- Airport type: Public
- Owner/Operator: City of Stevens Point
- Location: Stevens Point, Wisconsin
- Opened: February 1940
- Time zone: CST (UTC−06:00)
  - Summer (DST): CDT (UTC−05:00)
- Elevation AMSL: 1,110 ft (340 m)
- Coordinates: 44°32′42″N 089°31′49″W

Map
- Location of airport in Wisconsin STE (the United States)

Runways
Direction	Length		Surface
Direction	ft	m	Surface
3/21	6,028	1,837	Asphalt
12/30	3,635	1,108	Asphalt

Statistics
- Aircraft operations (2023): 36,750
- Based aircraft (2024): 35
- Source: Federal Aviation Administration

Stevens Point Municipal Airport (IATA: STE, ICAO: KSTE, FAA LID: STE) is a public airport located three miles (5 km) northeast of the central business district of Stevens Point, a city in Portage County, Wisconsin, United States. It is owned and operated by the city of Stevens Point. It is included in the Federal Aviation Administration (FAA) National Plan of Integrated Airport Systems for 2025–2029, in which it is categorized as a local general aviation facility.

== Airshow ==
A biannual airshow is held at Stevens Point Municipal Airport. The event includes meals, aircraft displays and inflight demonstrations. The show features various demonstrations and historical aircraft, especially warbirds. The show often partners with local organizations to honor veterans.

== Facilities and aircraft ==
Stevens Point Municipal Airport covers an area of 820 acres (330 ha) at an elevation of 1,110 feet (338 m) above mean sea level. The airport contains two asphalt paved runways: the primary runway 3/21 measuring 6,028 x 120 ft (1,837 x 37 m) with approved ILS and GPS approaches and the crosswind runway 12/30 measuring 3,635 x 75 ft (1,108 x 23 m) with approved GPS approaches.

The airport has an FBO offering fuel, aircraft parking and hangars, ground power units, a terminal with lounges, courtesy cars, snooze rooms and a weather station.

For the 12-month period ending August 2, 2023, the airport had 36,750 aircraft operations, an average of 101 per day: 91% general aviation, 8% air taxi and less than 1% military. In August 2024, there were 35 aircraft based at this airport: 31 single-engine, 3 multi-engine and 1 jet.

== Cargo operations ==
Airlines	Destinations
Freight Runners Express	Rhinelander

In 2019, aircraft flight tracking shows Freight Runners Express flying their Beechcraft Model 99 aircraft type for Stevens Point cargo operations.

== Accidents & Incidents ==
- On November. 26, 1995, a Cessna 172 Skyhawk crashed while attempting an instrument approach into Stevens Point. The pilot reported picking up icing 10 minutes out from the airport. The pilot failed to make visual contact with the airport at the minimum descent altitude (MDA) but descended below it after identifying a road. The pilot only saw the airport as he overflew it, and he attempted to circle to runway 12. The plane subsequently nosedived into nearby trees; though the pilot later claimed the engine had failed, a postaccident investigation found the engine had been operating normally at the time of the crash. The probable cause of the accident was found to be flight into known icing conditions and the pilot's descent below the MDA without making visual contact with the airport.
- On August 30, 2001, a Beech A23 Musketeer impacted terrain after taking off from Stevens Point. Witnesses report the pilot began a turnout after takeoff twenty feet from the ground. As the plane climbed, the pilot increased their bank until the aircraft flipped over at 50' above ground level. The probable cause was found to be the private pilot's inability to maintain aircraft control.
- On June 1, 2014, a YAK-55M crashed while performing at the Stevens Point Airshow. The aircraft was performing aerobatics when it crashed into trees 1,000' away from the runway. The sole pilot onboard was killed.

== See also ==
- List of airports in Wisconsin
