= Newbold, Wisconsin =

- Town
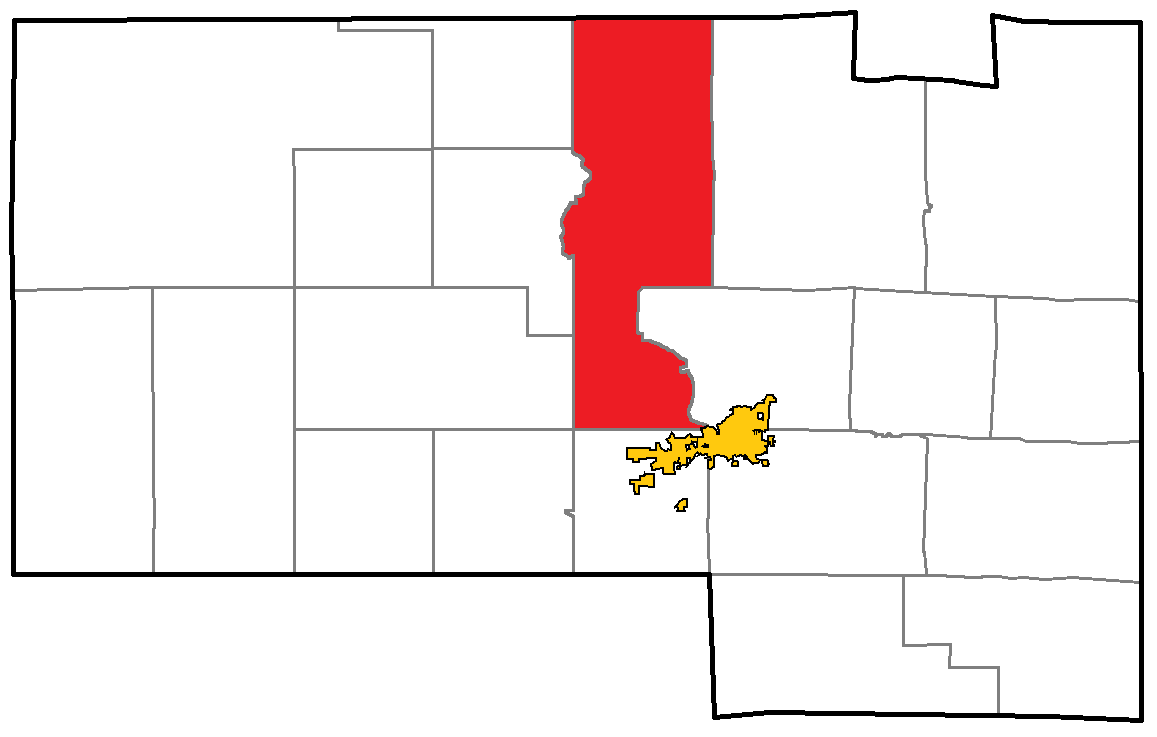
- Location of Newbold, within Oneida County
- Coordinates: 45°45′48″N 89°30′15″W
- Country: United States
- State: Wisconsin
- County: Oneida

Area
  - Total: 93.0 sq mi (240.9 km^{2})
  - Land: 79.1 sq mi (204.8 km^{2})
  - Water: 13.9 sq mi (36.1 km^{2})
- Elevation: 1,604 ft (489 m)

Population (2020)
  - Total: 2,831
  - Density: 35.80/sq mi (13.82/km^{2})
- Time zone: UTC-6 (Central (CST))
  - Summer (DST): UTC-5 (CDT)
- Area codes: 715 & 534
- FIPS code: 55-56425
- GNIS feature ID: 1583800
- Website: https://newboldwi.gov/

Newbold is a town in Oneida County, Wisconsin, United States. The population was 2,831 at the 2020 census. Tom Doyle Lake and the unincorporated communities of McNaughton and Newbold are located in the town.

== Geography ==
According to the United States Census Bureau, the town has a total area of 93.0 square miles (240.9 km^{2}), of which 79.1 square miles (204.8 km^{2}) is land and 13.9 square miles (36.1 km^{2}) (14.99%) is water.

== Demographics ==
As of the census of 2000, there were 2,710 people, 1,114 households, and 822 families residing in the town. The population density was 34.3 people per square mile (13.2/km^{2}). There were 2,074 housing units at an average density of 26.2 per square mile (10.1/km^{2}). The racial makeup of the town was 98.49% White, 0.07% African American, 0.48% Native American, 0.07% Asian, 0.55% from other races, and 0.33% from two or more races. Hispanic or Latino of any race were 0.96% of the population.

There were 1,114 households, out of which 28.1% had children under the age of 18 living with them, 67.0% were married couples living together, 4.5% had a female householder with no husband present, and 26.2% were non-families. 20.0% of all households were made up of individuals, and 7.9% had someone living alone who was 65 years of age or older. The average household size was 2.43 and the average family size was 2.81.

In the town, the population was spread out, with 22.7% under the age of 18, 4.4% from 18 to 24, 27.0% from 25 to 44, 31.5% from 45 to 64, and 14.4% who were 65 years of age or older. The median age was 43 years. For every 100 females, there were 103.6 males. For every 100 females age 18 and over, there were 104.3 males.

The median income for a household in the town was $40,722, and the median income for a family was $47,056. Males had a median income of $32,837 versus $22,586 for females. The per capita income for the town was $20,392. About 3.1% of families and 4.8% of the population were below the poverty line, including 7.9% of those under age 18 and 5.5% of those age 65 or over.

== Transportation ==
The Rhinelander-Oneida County Airport (KRHI) serves Newbold, the county and surrounding communities with both scheduled commercial jet service and general aviation services.
