= Gagen, Wisconsin =

- Unincorporated community
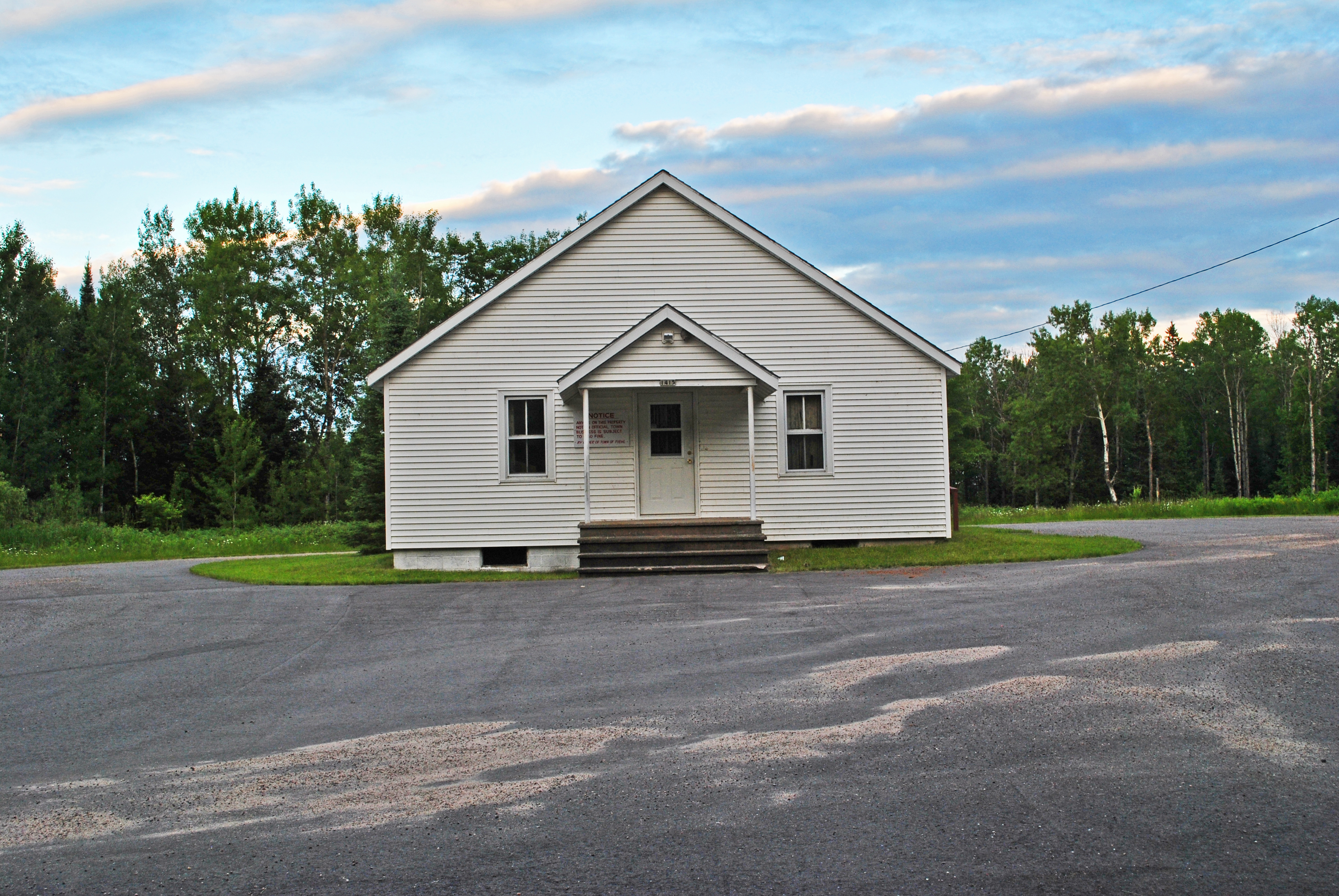
- Gagen Town Hall

- Location within Wisconsin Location within the United States
- Coordinates: 45°39′45″N 89°08′17″W
- Country: United States
- State: Wisconsin
- County: Oneida
- Elevation: 1,647 ft (502 m)
- Time zone: UTC-6 (Central (CST))
  - Summer (DST): UTC-5 (CDT)
- Area codes: 715 & 534
- GNIS feature ID: 1577607

Gagen is an unincorporated community located in the town of Piehl, Oneida County, Wisconsin, United States. Gagen is located along County Highway C near U.S. Route 45, 13.5 miles (21.7 km) east of Rhinelander.

== History ==
The settlement started as a logging camp. The Gagen Tract, was one of the finest timber belts in the Northwoods and had stands of pine, birch, maple, spruce, and cedar. A post office called Gagen operated between 1895 and 1942. The community was named for Daniel Gagen, an early settler.
