= Jennings, Wisconsin =

- Unincorporated community
- Location within Wisconsin Location within the United States
- Coordinates: 45°30′27″N 89°04′19″W
- Country: United States
- State: Wisconsin
- County: Oneida
- Elevation: 1,614 ft (492 m)
- Time zone: UTC-6 (Central (CST))
  - Summer (DST): UTC-5 (CDT)
- Area codes: 715 & 534
- GNIS feature ID: 1577663

Jennings is an unincorporated community located in the town of Schoepke, Oneida County, Wisconsin, United States. Jennings is located at the junction of County Highways B and Z, 19 miles (31 km) east-southeast of Rhinelander. Mecikalski General Store, Saloon, and Boarding House, which is listed on the National Register of Historic Places, is located in Jennings.
