= Pelican Lake, Wisconsin =

- Unincorporated community
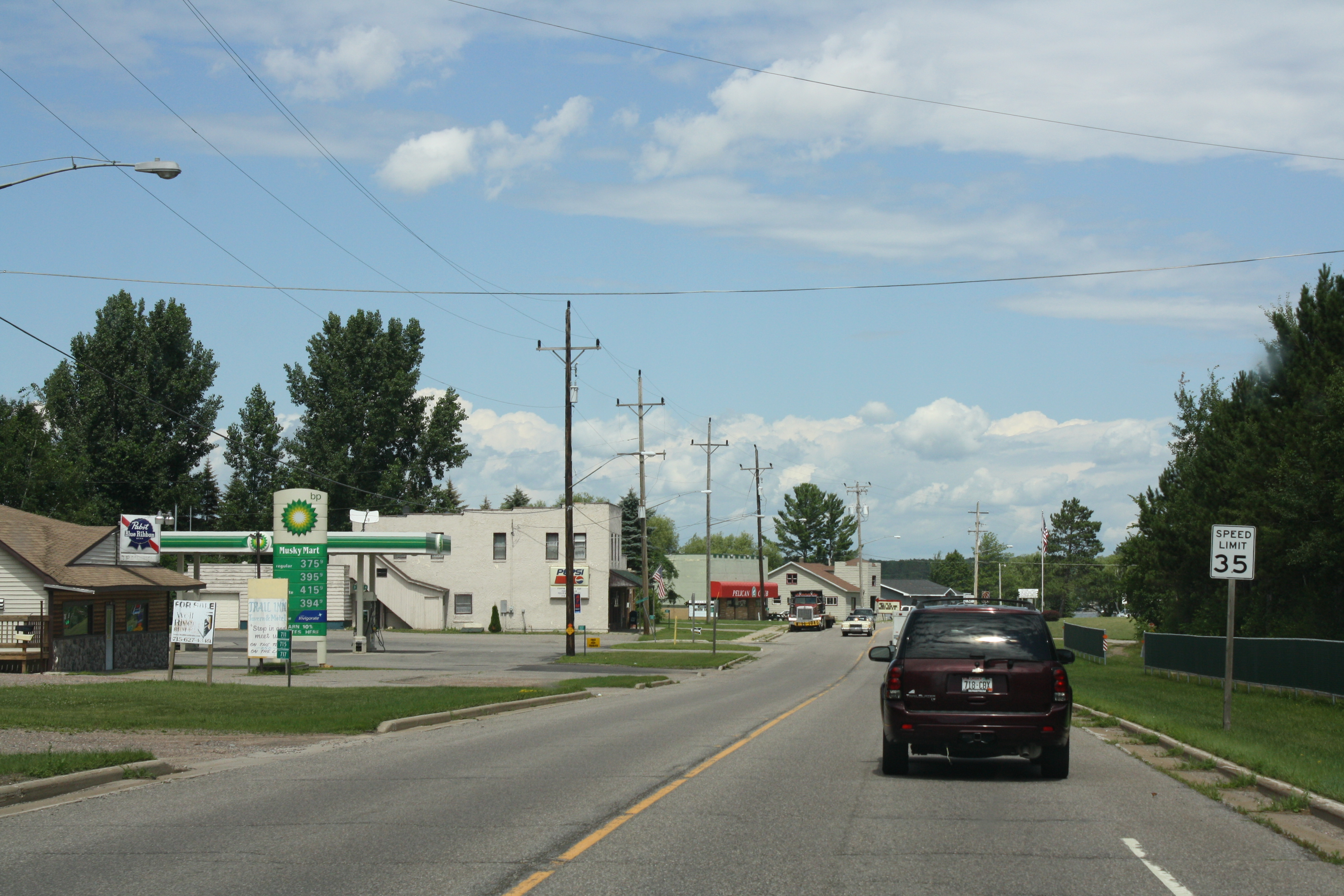
- Looking north in Pelican Lake

- Location within Wisconsin Location within the United States
- Coordinates: 45°29′58″N 89°10′00″W
- Country: United States
- State: Wisconsin
- County: Oneida
- Elevation: 1,601 ft (488 m)
- Time zone: UTC-6 (Central (CST))
  - Summer (DST): UTC-5 (CDT)
- ZIP code: 54463
- Area codes: 715 & 534
- GNIS feature ID: 1571153

Pelican Lake is an unincorporated community located in Oneida County, Wisconsin, United States. Pelican Lake is located on the eastern shore of Pelican Lake and is served by U.S. Route 45, in the town of Schoepke. Pelican Lake has a post office with ZIP code 54463.

Community groups include the Pelican Lake Association and the Pelican Lake Area Chamber of Commerce.

Pelican Lake is often referred to as the muskie capital of the world. The lake has yielded massive freshwater muskie and continues to produce 60"+ fish. Although the limit to keep these fish is 50", most anglers return the fish back into the water to continue growing and out of respect for the creatures and the sport.

== Images ==
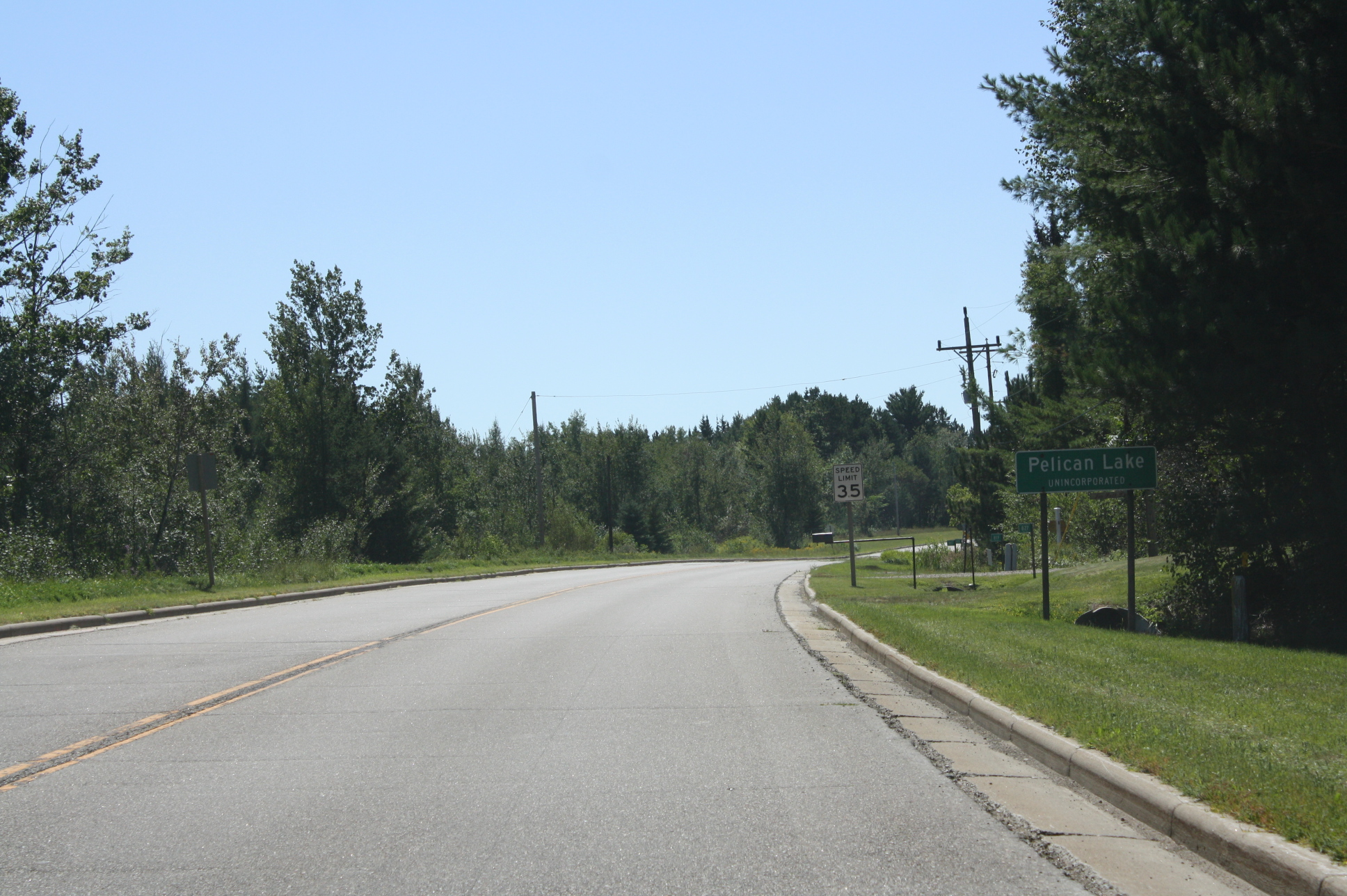
Pelican Lake sign on US45

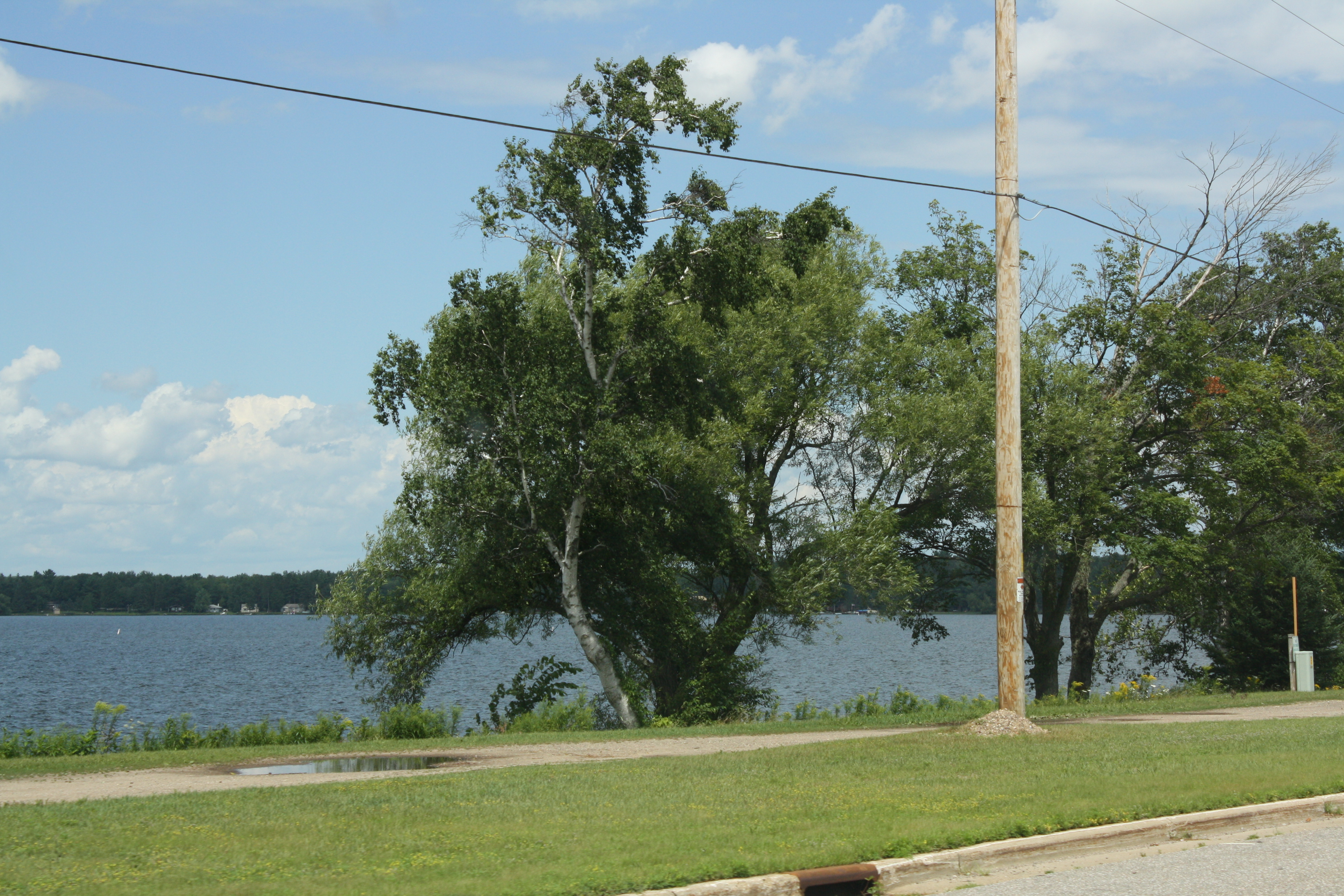
Pelican Lake

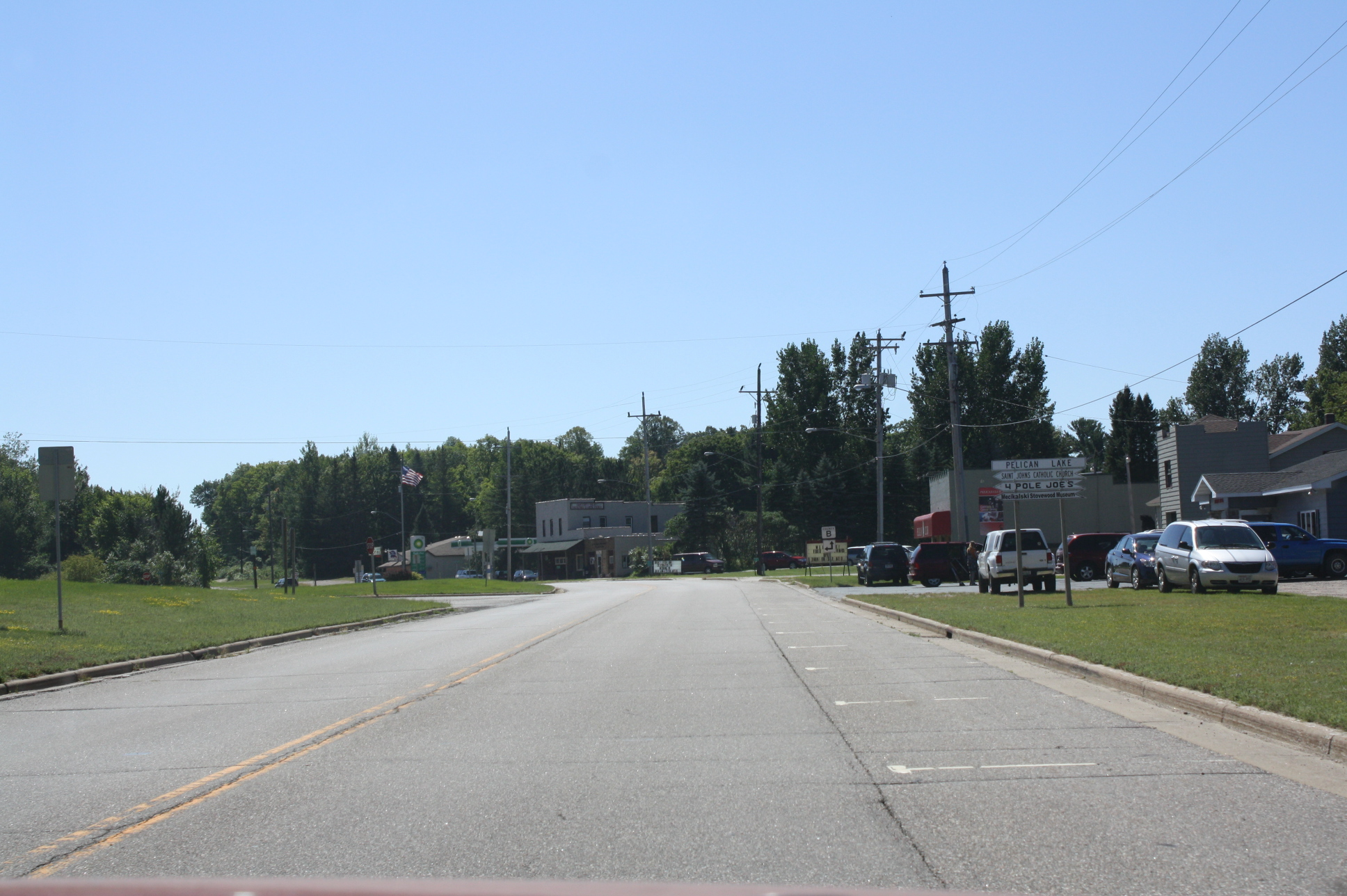
Looking south in Pelican Lake
