= Newbolt =

Newbolt is a surname. Notable people with the surname include:

- Sir Henry Newbolt (1862–1938), English poet
- Sir Francis Newbolt (1863-1940), English barrister, judge, writer and etcher
- John Henry Newbolt (1769–1823), English judge and founder of the Madras Literary Society
- William Newbolt (1844–1930), British Anglican priest and theologian

== See also ==
- Newbold (name)
- Newbould
