= Newbold (name) =

Newbold is both a surname and a masculine given name. Notable people with the name include:

== Surname ==
- Alf Newbold (1921–2002), English footballer
- Charles Newbold (1764–1835), American inventor
- Ethel Newbold (1882–1933), English epidemiologist and statistician
- Fred Newbold (born 2001), Welsh hockey player
- Gregory S. Newbold, American Marine Corps general
- Joshua G. Newbold (1830–1903), American politician from Iowa
- Marjory Newbold (1883–1926), Scottish socialist and communist politician
- Soon Hee Newbold (born 1974), Korean-born American composer
- Tricia Newbold, American government employee and whistleblower
- Walton Newbold (1888–1943), British politician

== Given name ==
- Newbold Black (1929–2013), American hockey player
- Newbold Morris (1902–1966), American politician and lawyer
- Newbold Noyes Jr. (1918–1997), American publisher, journalist, and newspaper editor

== See also ==
- Newbolt
- Newbould
- Newbold House (disambiguation), historic houses
