= Newbold (community), Wisconsin =

Newbold, Wisconsin
- Unincorporated community
- Location within Wisconsin Location within the United States
- Coordinates: 45°41′53″N 89°30′36″W
- Country: United States
- State: Wisconsin
- County: Oneida
- Elevation: 1,572 ft (479 m)
- Time zone: UTC-6 (Central (CST))
  - Summer (DST): UTC-5 (CDT)
- Area codes: 715 & 534
- GNIS feature ID: 1577748

Newbold is an unincorporated community located in the town of Newbold, Oneida County, Wisconsin, United States. Newbold is located on Wisconsin Highway 47, 6.5 miles (10.5 km) northwest of Rhinelander.

== History ==
The community was named for Fred Newbold, the nephew of a railroad official.
