= Oneida County, Wisconsin =

County in the United States

- County
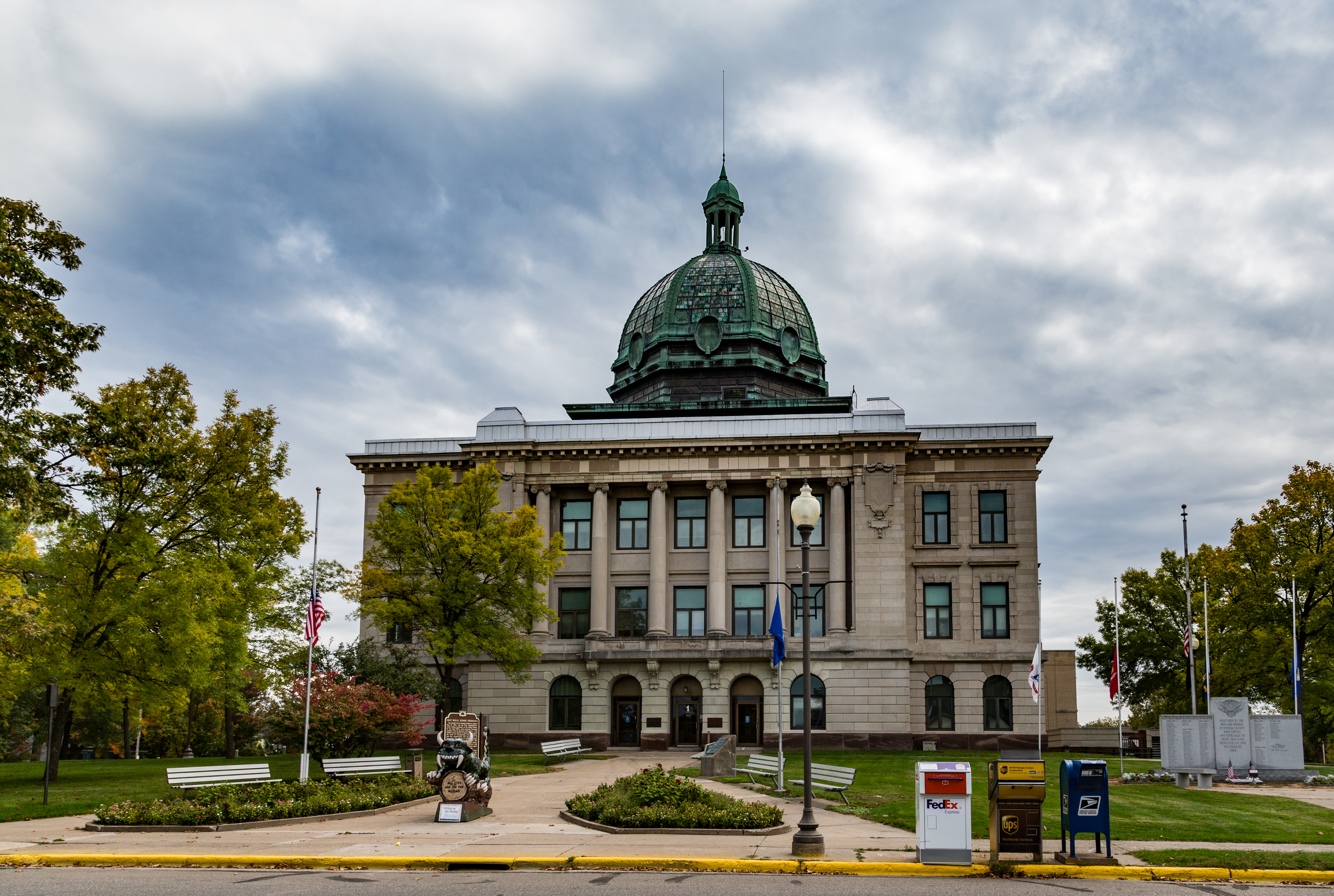
- Oneida County Courthouse in Rhinelander

- Location within the U.S. state of Wisconsin
- Coordinates: 45°42′N 89°31′W
- Country: United States
- State: Wisconsin
- Founded: 1887
- Named for: Oneida people
- Seat: Rhinelander
- Largest city: Rhinelander

Area
  - Total: 1,236 sq mi (3,200 km^{2})
  - Land: 1,113 sq mi (2,880 km^{2})
  - Water: 123 sq mi (320 km^{2}) 10%

Population (2020)
  - Total: 37,845
  - Estimate (2025): 38,131 ▲
  - Density: 34/sq mi (13/km^{2})
- Time zone: UTC−6 (Central)
  - Summer (DST): UTC−5 (CDT)
- Congressional district: 7th
- Website: www.oneidacountywi.gov

Oneida County is a county in the state of Wisconsin, United States. At the 2020 census, the population was 37,845. The county seat is Rhinelander. The county is considered a high-recreation retirement destination by the U.S. Department of Agriculture.

== History ==
Oneida County was formed in 1887 from sections of Lincoln County. It was named after the indigenous Oneida tribe, one of the five nations of the Iroquois.

== Geography ==
According to the U.S. Census Bureau, the county has a total area of 1,236 square miles (3,200 km^{2}), of which 1,113 square miles (2,880 km^{2}) are land and 123 square miles (320 km^{2}) (10%) are covered by water. Most people visit Oneida County to enjoy its lakes. In particular, tourists flock to Minocqua, a town of nearly 5,000 people with a summer population around 15,000.

=== Adjacent counties ===
- Forest County – east
- Langlade County – southeast
- Lincoln County – south
- Price County – west
- Vilas County – north

=== Major highways ===
- U.S. Highway 8
- U.S. Highway 45
- U.S. Highway 51
- Highway 17 (Wisconsin)
- Highway 32 (Wisconsin)
- Highway 47 (Wisconsin)
- Highway 70 (Wisconsin)

=== Railroads ===
- Watco

=== Airports ===
Oneida County is served by two public-use airports:

- Rhinelander–Oneida County Airport (KRHI) serves the county and surrounding communities with both scheduled commercial jet service and general aviation services.
- Three Lakes Municipal Airport (40D) enhances county general aviation service.

Dolhun Field Airport is also located in the county, but it is for private use by the members of the Dolhun Field Airpark Owners Association.

=== National protected area ===
- Nicolet National Forest (part)

== Demographics ==
Historical population
Census	Pop.	Note	%±
1890	5,010		—
1900	8,875		77.1%
1910	11,433		28.8%
1920	13,996		22.4%
1930	15,899		13.6%
1940	18,938		19.1%
1950	20,648		9.0%
1960	22,112		7.1%
1970	24,427		10.5%
1980	31,216		27.8%
1990	31,679		1.5%
2000	36,776		16.1%
2010	35,998		−2.1%
2020	37,845		5.1%
2025 (est.)	38,131	▲	0.8%
U.S. Decennial Census; 1790–1960 1900–1990; 1990–2000 2010 2020

2000 Census Age Pyramid for Oneida County

=== Racial and ethnic composition ===
Oneida County, Wisconsin – Racial and ethnic composition Note: the US Census treats Hispanic/Latino as an ethnic category. This table excludes Latinos from the racial categories and assigns them to a separate category. Hispanics/Latinos may be of any race.
Race / ethnicity (NH = Non-Hispanic)	Pop 1980	Pop 1990	Pop 2000	Pop 2010	Pop 2020	% 1980	% 1990	% 2000	% 2010	% 2020
White alone (NH)	30,901	31,258	35,794	34,560	35,264	98.99%	98.67%	97.33%	96.01%	93.18%
Black or African American alone (NH)	7	57	114	150	205	0.02%	0.18%	0.31%	0.42%	0.54%
Native American or Alaska Native alone (NH)	191	221	233	295	441	0.61%	0.70%	0.63%	0.82%	1.17%
Asian alone (NH)	30	51	109	188	195	0.10%	0.16%	0.30%	0.52%	0.52%
Native Hawaiian or Pacific Islander alone (NH)	x	x	14	5	18	x	x	0.04%	0.01%	0.05%
Other race alone (NH)	12	2	14	2	117	0.04%	0.01%	0.04%	0.01%	0.31%
Mixed race or Multiracial (NH)	x	x	254	413	1,030	x	x	0.69%	1.15%	2.72%
Hispanic or Latino (any race)	75	90	244	385	575	0.24%	0.28%	0.66%	1.07%	1.52%
Total	31,216	31,679	36,776	35,998	37,845	100.00%	100.00%	100.00%	100.00%	100.00%

=== 2020 census ===
As of the 2020 census, the population was 37,845. The population density was 34.0 people per square mile (13.1 people/km^{2}). There were 30,465 housing units at an average density of 27.3 units per square mile (10.5 units/km^{2}).

The racial makeup of the county was 93.7% White, 0.6% Black or African American, 1.2% American Indian and Alaska Native, 0.5% Asian, <0.1% Native Hawaiian and Pacific Islander, 0.6% from some other race, and 3.3% from two or more races. Hispanic or Latino residents of any race comprised 1.5% of the population.

The median age was 52.8 years. 16.9% of residents were under the age of 18 and 28.1% of residents were 65 years of age or older. For every 100 females there were 102.4 males, and for every 100 females age 18 and over there were 101.1 males.

There were 17,404 households in the county, of which 19.9% had children under the age of 18 living in them. Of all households, 50.3% were married-couple households, 20.1% were households with a male householder and no spouse or partner present, and 22.2% were households with a female householder and no spouse or partner present. About 32.0% of all households were made up of individuals and 16.0% had someone living alone who was 65 years of age or older.

25.7% of residents lived in urban areas, while 74.3% lived in rural areas.

Of the 30,465 housing units, 42.9% were vacant. Among occupied housing units, 78.3% were owner-occupied and 21.7% were renter-occupied. The homeowner vacancy rate was 1.8% and the rental vacancy rate was 8.5%.

=== 2000 census ===
At the census of 2000, 36,776 people, 15,333 households, and 10,487 families resided in the county. The population density was 33 people per square mile (13 people/km^{2}). The 26,627 housing units averaged 24 units per square mile (9.3 units/km^{2}). The racial makeup of the county was 97.71% White, 0.33% Black or African American, 0.66% Native American, 0.30% Asian, 0.05% Pacific Islander, 0.21% from other races, and 0.75% from two or more races. About 0.66% of the population was Hispanic or Latino of any race. The ancestry of the population was around 44.4% was of German, 8.8% Polish, 7.9% Irish, 5.2% Norwegian, and 5.2% English.

Of the 15,333 households, 27.00% had children under the age of 18 living with them, 57.80% were married couples living together, 7.10% had a female householder with no husband present, and 31.60% were not families. About 26.40% of all households were made up of individuals, and 12.00% had someone living alone who was 65 years of age or older. The average household size was 2.34 and the average family size was 2.82.

In the county, the population was distributed as 22.30% under the age of 18, 5.70% from 18 to 24, 26.50% from 25 to 44, 26.80% from 45 to 64, and 18.70% who were 65 years of age or older. The median age was 42 years. For every 100 females, there were 99.20 males. For every 100 females age 18 and over, there were 97.30 males.

In 2017, there were 324 births, giving a general fertility rate of 66.2 births per 1000 women aged 15–44, the 24th highest rate out of all 72 Wisconsin counties.

== Communities ==
=== City ===
- Rhinelander (county seat)

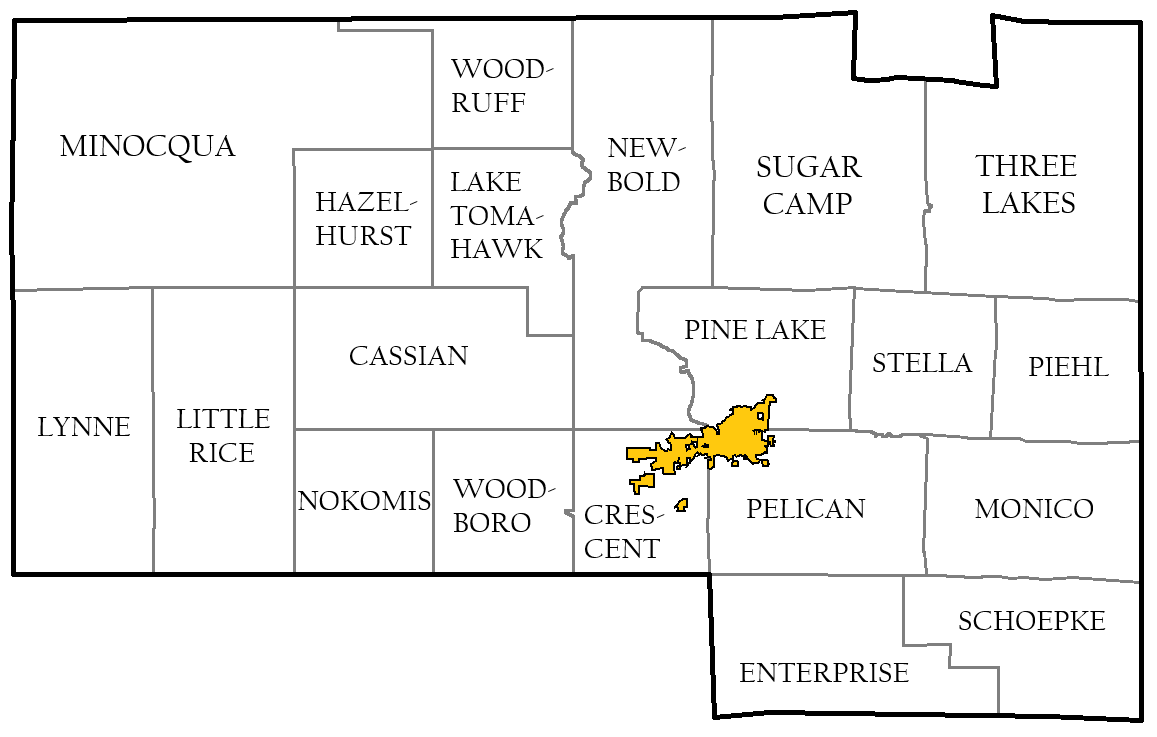
Towns of Oneida County

=== Towns ===
- Cassian
- Crescent
- Enterprise
- Hazelhurst
- Lake Tomahawk
- Little Rice
- Lynne
- Minocqua
- Monico
- Newbold
- Nokomis
- Pelican
- Piehl
- Pine Lake
- Schoepke
- Stella
- Sugar Camp
- Three Lakes
- Woodboro
- Woodruff

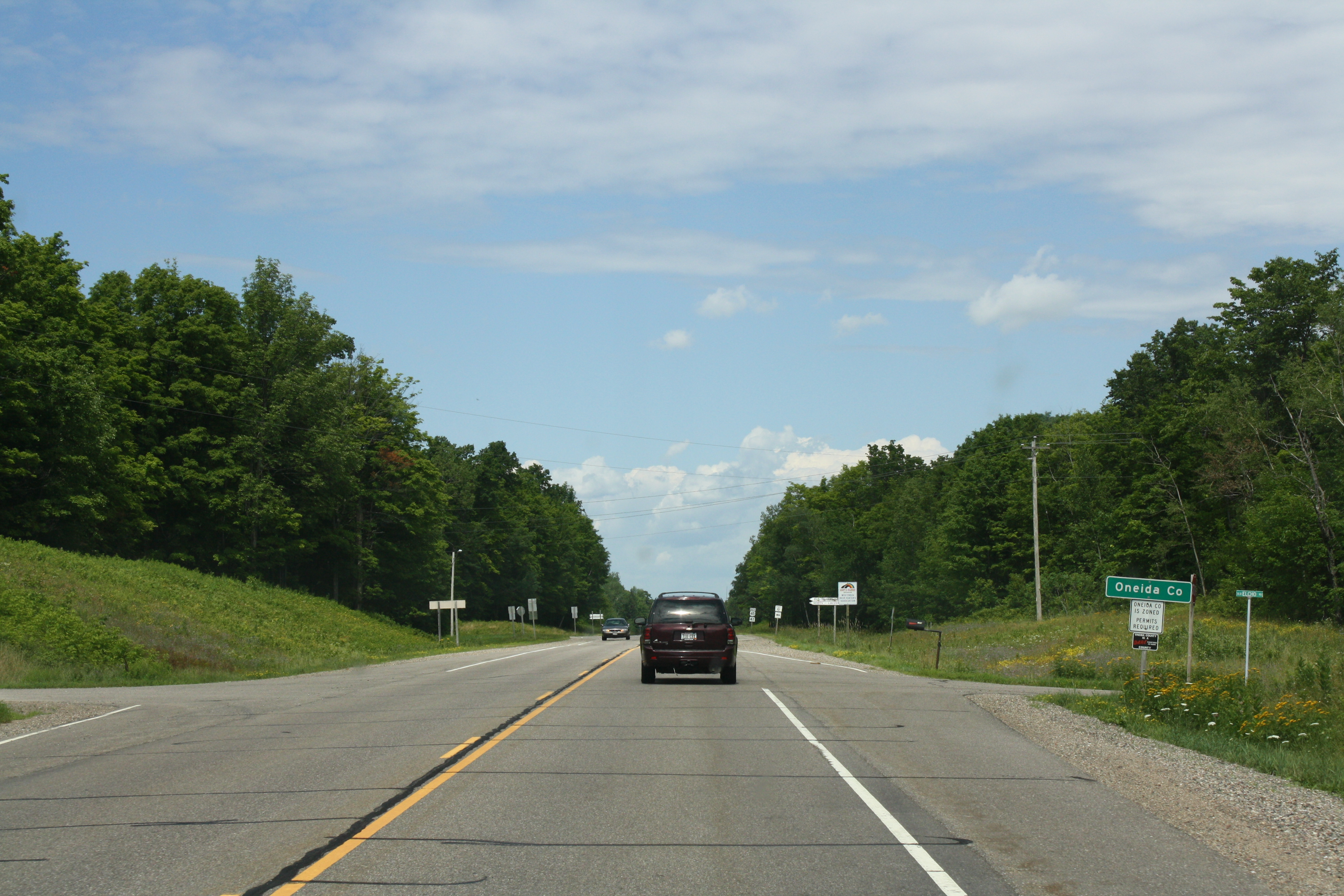
Oneida County sign on U.S. Route 45

=== Census-designated places ===
- Lake Tomahawk
- Minocqua
- Three Lakes
- Woodruff

=== Unincorporated communities ===
- Clearwater Lake
- Clifford (partial)
- Crescent Corner
- Enterprise
- Gagen
- Gary Post
- Goodnow
- Harshaw
- Hazelhurst
- Jennings
- Lennox
- McCord
- Malvern
- Monico
- McNaughton
- Newbold
- Pelican Lake
- Pratt Junction
- Rantz
- Roosevelt
- Sugar Camp
- Starks
- Sunflower
- Tripoli (partial)
- Woodboro

=== Ghost towns/neighborhoods ===
- Manson

== Politics ==
Oneida County tends to lean Republican, though it was a bellwether from 1928 to 2008, backing the nationwide winner in all but two elections in that span, deviating in 1960 and 1976 (by less than 1%), supporting losing Republicans in two of the closest elections in American history. Since 1964, when Lyndon Johnson carried it in his national landslide, the county has only voted Democratic three times. Two of these wins were by Bill Clinton in 1992 and 1996, whose victories were almost entirely due to the heavy third-party performance of Ross Perot, which significantly lowered the Republican vote in the county. In 2008, like the state of Wisconsin as a whole, the county swung heavily Democratic in support of Barack Obama who carried it by a full majority. Since then, the county has voted Republican in every election, and since 2016 by double-digit margins.

United States presidential election results for Oneida County, Wisconsin
Year	Republican		Democratic		Third party(ies)	
Year	No.	%	No.	%	No.	%
1892	1,149	45.20%	1,317	51.81%	76	2.99%
1896	1,453	70.64%	563	27.37%	41	1.99%
1900	1,802	70.34%	708	27.63%	52	2.03%
1904	1,710	75.50%	375	16.56%	180	7.95%
1908	1,536	58.92%	688	26.39%	383	14.69%
1912	774	36.56%	717	33.87%	626	29.57%
1916	1,089	45.19%	1,054	43.73%	267	11.08%
1920	2,424	64.93%	833	22.31%	476	12.75%
1924	1,769	33.07%	324	6.06%	3,257	60.88%
1928	3,100	54.32%	2,504	43.88%	103	1.80%
1932	1,992	28.82%	4,542	65.70%	379	5.48%
1936	2,294	28.48%	5,208	64.65%	554	6.88%
1940	3,694	40.39%	5,375	58.77%	77	0.84%
1944	3,253	44.06%	4,076	55.21%	54	0.73%
1948	3,729	46.53%	4,081	50.92%	205	2.56%
1952	6,224	61.86%	3,808	37.85%	30	0.30%
1956	6,261	64.89%	3,328	34.49%	59	0.61%
1960	5,676	53.22%	4,974	46.63%	16	0.15%
1964	3,909	37.75%	6,431	62.11%	15	0.14%
1968	5,077	48.55%	4,435	42.41%	946	9.05%
1972	6,811	58.83%	4,262	36.81%	504	4.35%
1976	7,347	49.26%	7,216	48.38%	353	2.37%
1980	8,602	51.19%	7,008	41.70%	1,195	7.11%
1984	9,787	59.79%	6,417	39.20%	165	1.01%
1988	8,130	51.88%	7,414	47.31%	126	0.80%
1992	6,725	35.94%	7,160	38.26%	4,829	25.80%
1996	6,339	37.47%	7,619	45.04%	2,959	17.49%
2000	9,512	50.35%	8,339	44.14%	1,040	5.51%
2004	11,351	51.50%	10,464	47.48%	224	1.02%
2008	9,630	43.92%	11,907	54.30%	390	1.78%
2012	10,917	50.42%	10,452	48.27%	283	1.31%
2016	12,132	56.35%	8,109	37.66%	1,290	5.99%
2020	13,671	56.59%	10,105	41.83%	383	1.59%
2024	14,455	58.06%	10,080	40.49%	360	1.45%

== See also ==
- National Register of Historic Places listings in Oneida County, Wisconsin
