= Rhinelander–Oneida County Airport =

Airport located in Rhinelander, Wisconsin

- IATA: RHI; ICAO: KRHI; FAA LID: RHI

Summary
- Airport type: Public
- Owner: City of Rhinelander & Oneida County
- Serves: Rhinelander, Wisconsin
- Opened: May 1944
- Time zone: CST (UTC−06:00)
  - Summer (DST): CDT (UTC−05:00)
- Elevation AMSL: 1,623 ft (495 m)
- Coordinates: 45°37′51″N 089°27′59″W
- Website: www.flyrhinelander.com

Maps
- FAA airport diagram

- Location of airport in Wisconsin RHI (the United States)

Runways
| Direction | Length | | Surface |
| Direction | ft | m | Surface |
|---|---|---|---|
| 9/27 | 6,800 | 2,073 | Concrete |
| 15/33 | 5,201 | 1,585 | Asphalt |

Statistics (12 months ending August 2026 ^{except where noted})
- Passenger volume: 56,950
- Departing passengers: 28,950
- Scheduled flights: 1,276
- Cargo (lb.): 818k
- Aircraft operations (2022): 24,958
- Based aircraft (2024): 43
- Source: Federal Aviation Administration, RITA

Rhinelander–Oneida County Airport (IATA: RHI, ICAO: KRHI, FAA LID: RHI) is a public use airport located 2 nautical miles (3.7 km; 2.3 mi) southwest of the central business district of Rhinelander, a city in Oneida County, Wisconsin, United States. The airport is owned by the city and county. It is primarily used for general aviation and is also served by two commercial airlines.

It is included in the Federal Aviation Administration (FAA) National Plan of Integrated Airport Systems for 2025–2029, in which it is categorized as a non-hub primary commercial service facility. It is the seventh busiest of the eight commercial airports in Wisconsin in terms of passengers served, and the only one to not have air traffic control services on field.

== History ==
In 1975, North Central Airlines (which later merged with Southern and Hughes Air West to form Republic, which was acquired by Northwest Airlines, itself acquired by Delta Air Lines) was considering ending service to Rhinelander. Robert Heck, who worked as a stockbroker in the same office building in Wausau, Wisconsin as Arthur Mueller, head of North Central Airlines, learned of that news. Heck then worked on a campaign, enlisting local and national business officials to modernize the airport and retain North Central service. He made presentations locally and in Washington, D.C., which led to businesses opening near the airport and a 1979 airport terminal to replace one that was 3,482 square foot in size. Heck later became a member of the airport commission. He was awarded the 1976 Aviation Award at the 21st annual Wisconsin Aeronautics Conference.

== Facilities and aircraft ==
Rhinelander–Oneida County Airport covers an area of 1,259 acres (509 ha) at an elevation of 1,623.3 feet (494.8 m) above mean sea level. It has two runways: the primary runway 9/27 is 6,800 by 150 feet (2,073 x 46 m) concrete runway with approved ILS, GPS and VOR/DME approaches, and the crosswind runway 15/33 is 5,201 by 100 feet (1,585 x 30 m) asphalt runway with approved GPS approaches. Runway 27 has a 100 foot asphalt stop-way on the western end. In addition, the Rhinelander VORTAC (RHI) navigational facility is located at the field.

For the 12-month period ending December 31, 2022, the airport had 24,958 aircraft operations, an average of 68 per day: 88% general aviation, 6% scheduled commercial and 6% air taxi. In August 2024, there were 43 aircraft based at this airport: 37 single-engine, 3 multi-engine, 2 jet and 1 helicopter. Both based and transient general aviation aircraft are supported by the fixed-base operator (FBO) Lakeland Aviation of Rhinelander.

The Rhinelander–Oneida County Airport enhances regional air travel safety by maintaining an Aircraft Rescue and Firefighting (ARFF) 'Index A' trained team and related equipment.

== Airlines and destinations ==
=== Passenger ===
| Airlines | Destinations |
|---|---|
| Delta Connection | Minneapolis/St. Paul |
| United Express | Seasonal: Chicago–O'Hare |

Destinations map
All passenger destinations from Rhinelander–Oneida County Airport
Red = Year-round destination
Green = Seasonal destination
Blue = Future destination
Purple = Route ending

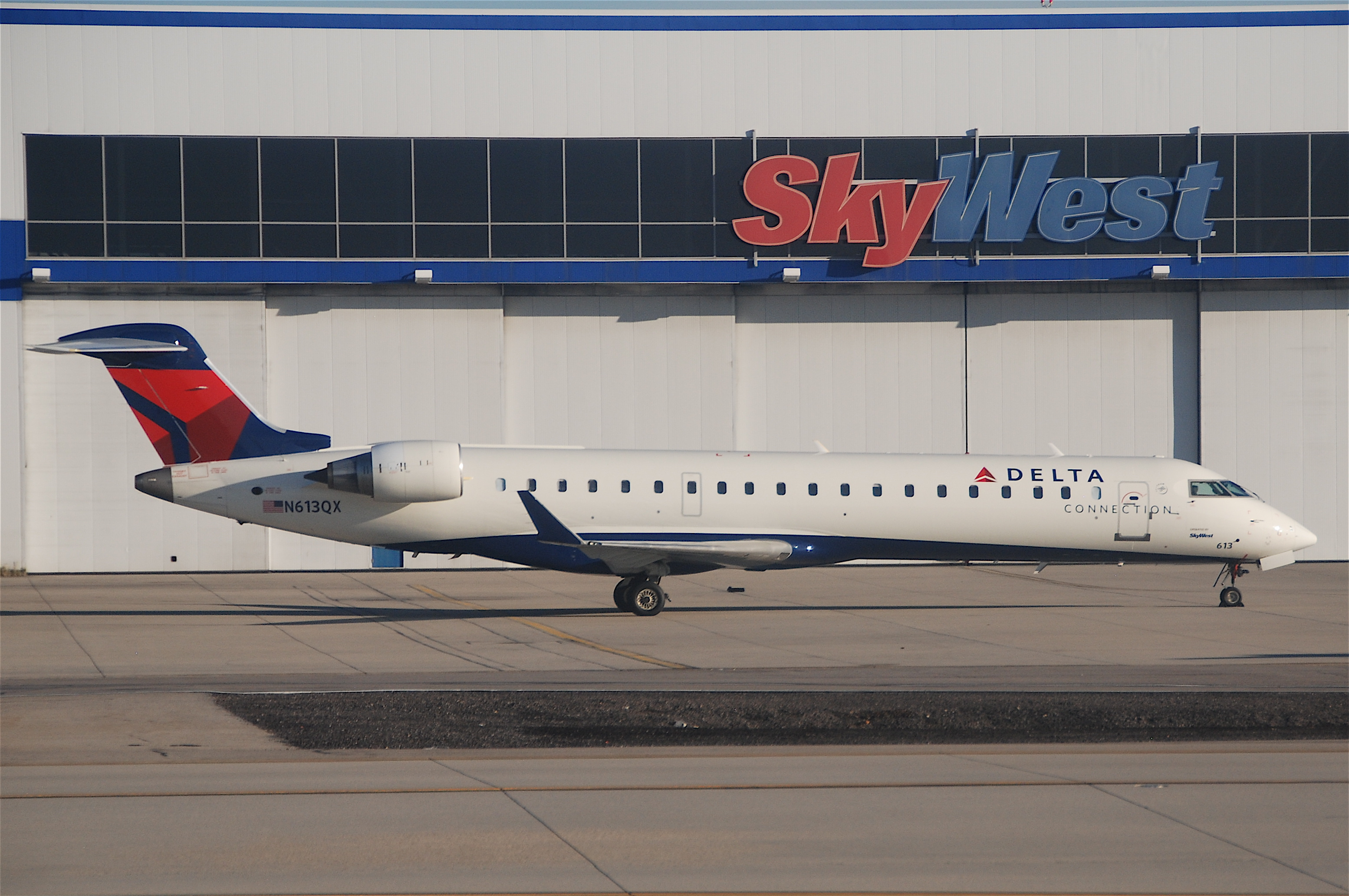
Bombardier CRJ550, owned and operated by SkyWest Airlines for Delta Connection

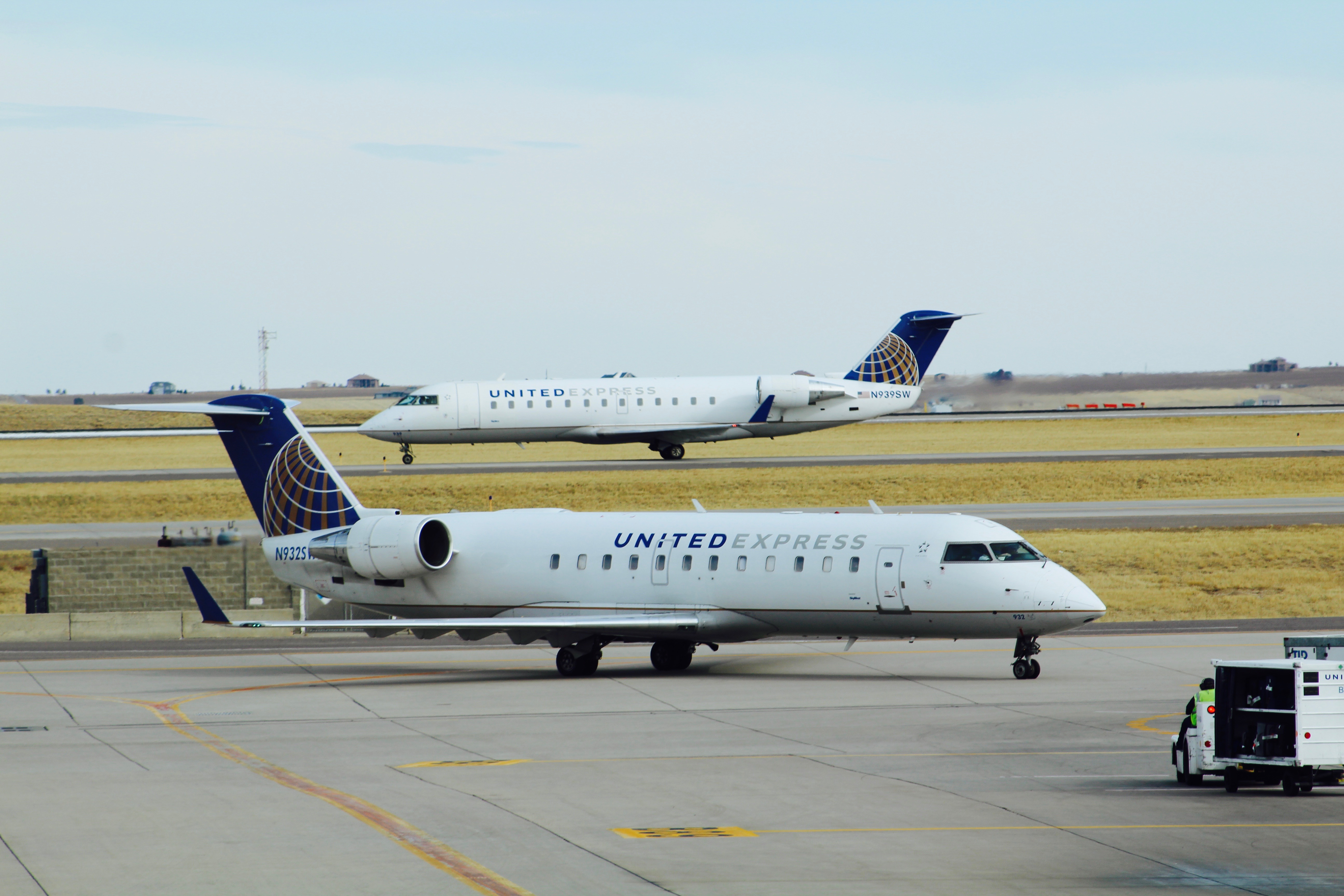
Two United Express Bombardier CRJ200s

The airport is part of the federal government Essential Air Service program. In 2012, Delta Connection carrier SkyWest Airlines bid for and then won the EAS contract on January 3, 2013. The airline currently receives $2,560,031 in federal subsidies per year operating 50-seat Bombardier CRJ550 jet aircraft through to January 31, 2026. Seasonally, Delta uses the larger CRJ900 jets on the Minneapolis route. This was especially evident during the COVID-19 pandemic, in which Delta Connection flew fewer flights but instead used their larger 76-seat aircraft.

Past air service includes Midwest Airlines, Frontier Airlines and Great Lakes Airlines. Northwest Airlines served the Minneapolis route and also had service to Detroit prior to the merger with Delta.

=== Top destinations ===
Busiest routes departing RHI (September 2025 – August 2026)
| Rank | City | Passengers | Carrier |
|---|---|---|---|
| 1 | Minneapolis/St. Paul, MN | 24,290 | Delta |
| 2 | Chicago–O'Hare, Illinois | 4,660 | United |

== Cargo ==
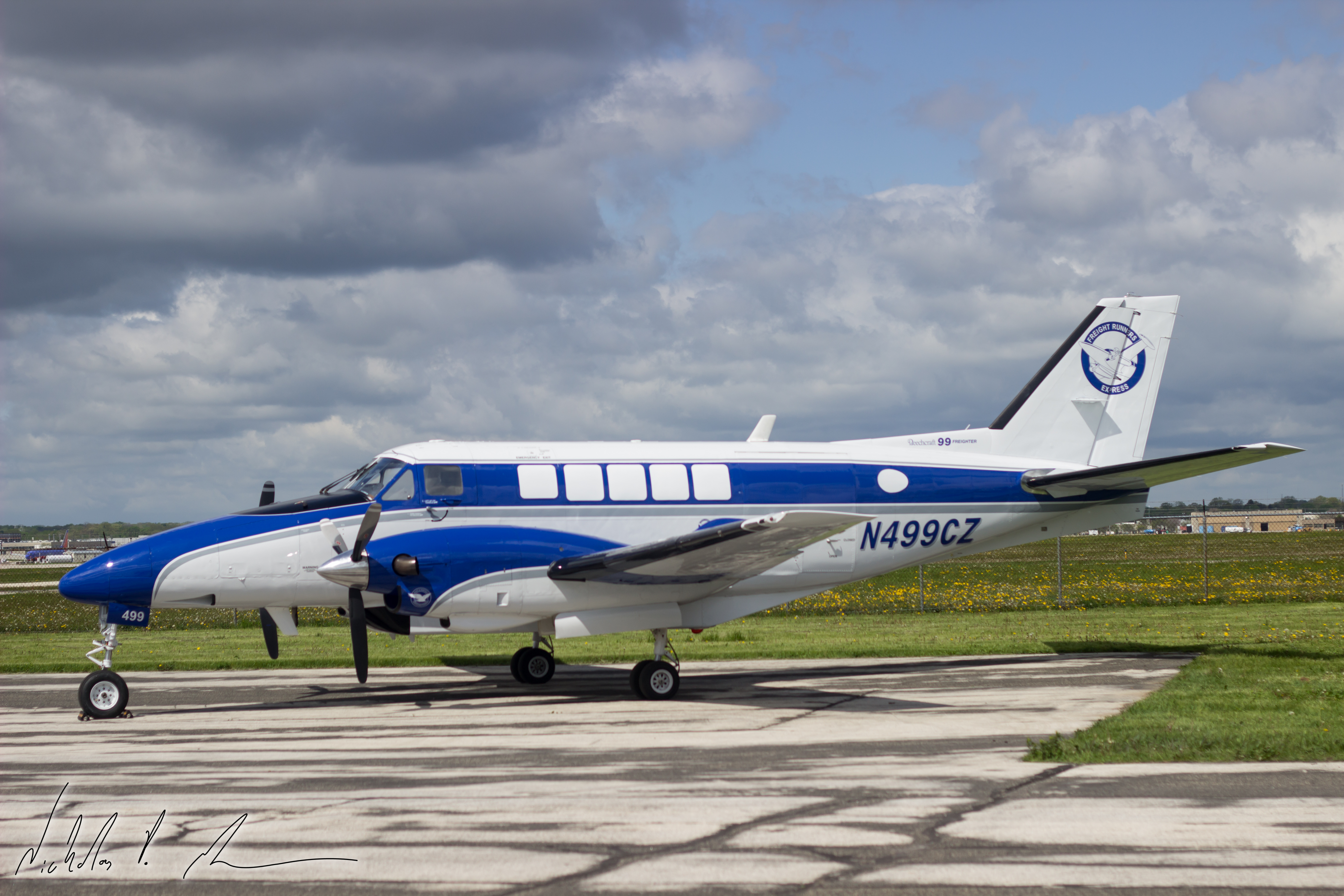
Freight Runners Express Beech 99 Freighter

| Airlines | Destinations |
|---|---|
| FedEx Feeder | Madison, Milwaukee |
| Freight Runners Express | Madison, Milwaukee, Mosinee, Oshkosh, Stevens Point |
| PACC Air | Appleton, Milwaukee, Mosinee |

== Accidents ==
- On October 15, 1970, a Canadian Consolidated PBY Catalina operated by Barringer Research Inc. attempted to take off for a flight to test mineral research equipment. There was a large accumulation of frost on the airframe which caused the aircraft to stall and crash. Two crew out of the five occupants on board were killed.

== Popular culture ==
John Heisman, college football's Heisman Trophy namesake, is buried in Rhinelander, which is his wife's hometown. A statue of Heisman is located just inside the Rhinelander-Oneida County airport.

== See also ==
- List of airports in Wisconsin
