= Arthur Rogers =

Arthur Rogers may refer to:

- Arthur M. Rogers (1860–1939), member of the Wisconsin State Assembly
- Arthur William Rogers (1872–1946), British and South African geologist
- Arthur Rogers (footballer) (born 1996), English footballer
