= Tony Evers =

Governor of Wisconsin since 2019

- Evers in 2022

46th Governor of Wisconsin
- Incumbent
- Assumed office January 7, 2019
- Lieutenant: Mandela Barnes; Sara Rodriguez
- Preceded by: Scott Walker

26th Superintendent of Public Instruction of Wisconsin
- In office July 6, 2009 – January 7, 2019
- Governor: Jim Doyle; Scott Walker
- Preceded by: Elizabeth Burmaster
- Succeeded by: Carolyn Stanford Taylor

Personal details
- Born: Anthony Steven Evers; November 5, 1951 (age 75) Plymouth, Wisconsin, U.S.
- Party: Democratic
- Spouse: Kathy Noordyk (m. 1982)
- Children: 3
- Education: University of Wisconsin, Madison (BA, MA, PhD)
- Website: Office website Campaign website
- Evers's voice Evers on infrastructure development and highway safety. Recorded May 7, 2024

Anthony Steven Evers (/ˈiːvərz/ EE-vərz; born November 5, 1951) is an American politician and educator serving since 2019 as the 46th governor of Wisconsin. A member of the Democratic Party, he served from 2009 to 2019 as Wisconsin's 26th superintendent of public instruction.

Born and raised in Plymouth, Wisconsin, Evers was educated at the University of Wisconsin–Madison, where he earned bachelor's, master's, and doctoral degrees in educational administration. After working as a teacher, he became a school administrator, serving as a principal and later as a district superintendent. Evers ran unsuccessfully for Superintendent of Public Instruction in 1993, 1997, and 2001. After his 2001 loss, state superintendent Elizabeth Burmaster appointed him deputy superintendent, a position he held from 2001 to 2009. In 2009, he ran for Superintendent of Public Instruction again and won. He was reelected in 2013 and 2017.

In August 2017, Evers announced that he would run for governor of Wisconsin in the 2018 election. He won the crowded Democratic primary in August 2018 with 41.8% of the vote. Incumbent Republican governor Scott Walker was seen as vulnerable and had been criticized for his education policies. Evers defeated Walker by a margin of 1.1% and was reelected by a larger margin of 3.4% in 2022, defeating Republican nominee Tim Michels.

Evers often made use of the governor's veto power due to his opposition to much of the Republican-controlled Wisconsin Legislature's agenda. Under Wisconsin law, the governor's veto power is stronger than it is in other U.S. states. Evers has used his veto power more often than any other governor in Wisconsin history, and has used his line-item veto power to change Republican-authored bills. In July 2025, Evers announced he would not seek reelection in 2026.

== Early life and career ==
Tony Evers was born on November 5, 1951, in Plymouth, Wisconsin, the son of Jean (Gorrow) and Raymond Evers, a physician. His first job was "as a kid, scraping mold off of cheese" in Plymouth. As a young adult, Evers worked as a caregiver in a nursing home. He attended Plymouth High School. He earned bachelor's (1973), master's (1976), and doctoral degrees (1986) in educational leadership from the University of Wisconsin–Madison. He began his professional career as a teacher and media coordinator in the Tomah school district. From 1979 to 1980 he was principal of Tomah Elementary School, and from 1980 to 1984 he was principal of Tomah High School. From 1984 to 1988 Evers was superintendent of the Oakfield school district, and from 1988 to 1992 he was superintendent of the Verona Area School District. From 1992 to 2001 he was administrator of the Cooperative Education Service Agency (CESA) in Oshkosh.

== Department of Public Instruction (2001–2019) ==
Evers first ran for state superintendent, a nonpartisan post, in 1993, losing to John Benson. He ran again in 1997 and placed fifth in the primary. He ran again in 2001 and finished third in the primary. Elizabeth Burmaster won the primary and the general election, and appointed Evers deputy superintendent, a position he held until Burmaster was appointed president of Nicolet College. While serving as Burmaster's deputy, Evers served as president of the Council of Chief State School Officers.

=== State Superintendent ===
Evers then ran again in 2009, this time winning. He defeated Rose Fernandez in the general election. In April 2013, Evers defeated Don Pridemore and won reelection. In 2017, Evers defeated Republican candidate Lowell Holtz, a former Beloit superintendent, with about 70% of the vote.

In 2009, Evers used government email accounts to solicit campaign donations during work hours. He and another government employee were fined $250 each for the solicitations.

In 2014, Evers proposed a $1.7 billion increase in state funding for K–12 schools. Wisconsin Governor Scott Walker did not include Evers's proposal in his state budgets, citing the cost. In 2017, Evers called for a tenfold increase in school mental health funding.

In October 2018, a divided federal appeals court found that, because there was a nearby archdiocesan school, Evers had violated neither the U.S. Constitution's Free Exercise Clause nor its Establishment Clause when he denied busing to an independent Catholic school. The U.S. Supreme Court vacated that judgment in 2020 and remanded the case for further consideration. After the Wisconsin Supreme Court answered a question of state law certified by the federal appeals court, the Seventh Circuit ruled in 2021 that the denial of transportation benefits violated Wisconsin law and remanded the case for further proceedings.

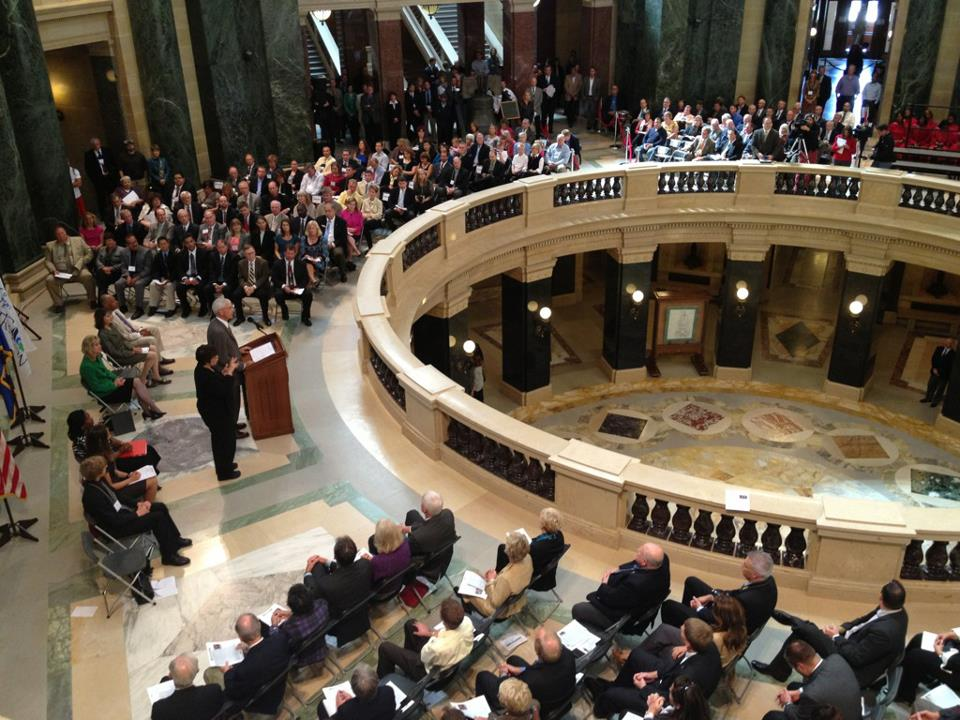
Evers delivering the 2012 "State of Education Address" in the Wisconsin Capitol Rotunda

== Governor of Wisconsin (2019–present) ==
=== Elections ===
==== 2018 ====
On August 23, 2017, Evers announced that he would seek the Democratic nomination for governor of Wisconsin in 2018. He cited his 2017 reelection as state superintendent with over 70% of the vote, as well as his criticism of Governor Walker, as key reasons for deciding to run. Evers launched his first campaign advertisement against Walker on August 28, 2017. Evers won the eight-candidate Democratic primary on August 14, 2018. On November 6, 2018, Evers narrowly defeated Walker in the general election.

==== 2022 ====
Evers sought reelection in 2022. His 2018 running mate, Lieutenant Governor Mandela Barnes, instead chose to run for U.S. Senate. In the August Democratic primary, Evers was unopposed and Brookfield-area state representative Sara Rodriguez was nominated as his running mate. In the general election, Evers and Rodriguez defeated the Republican ticket of Tim Michels and Roger Roth.

=== Tenure ===
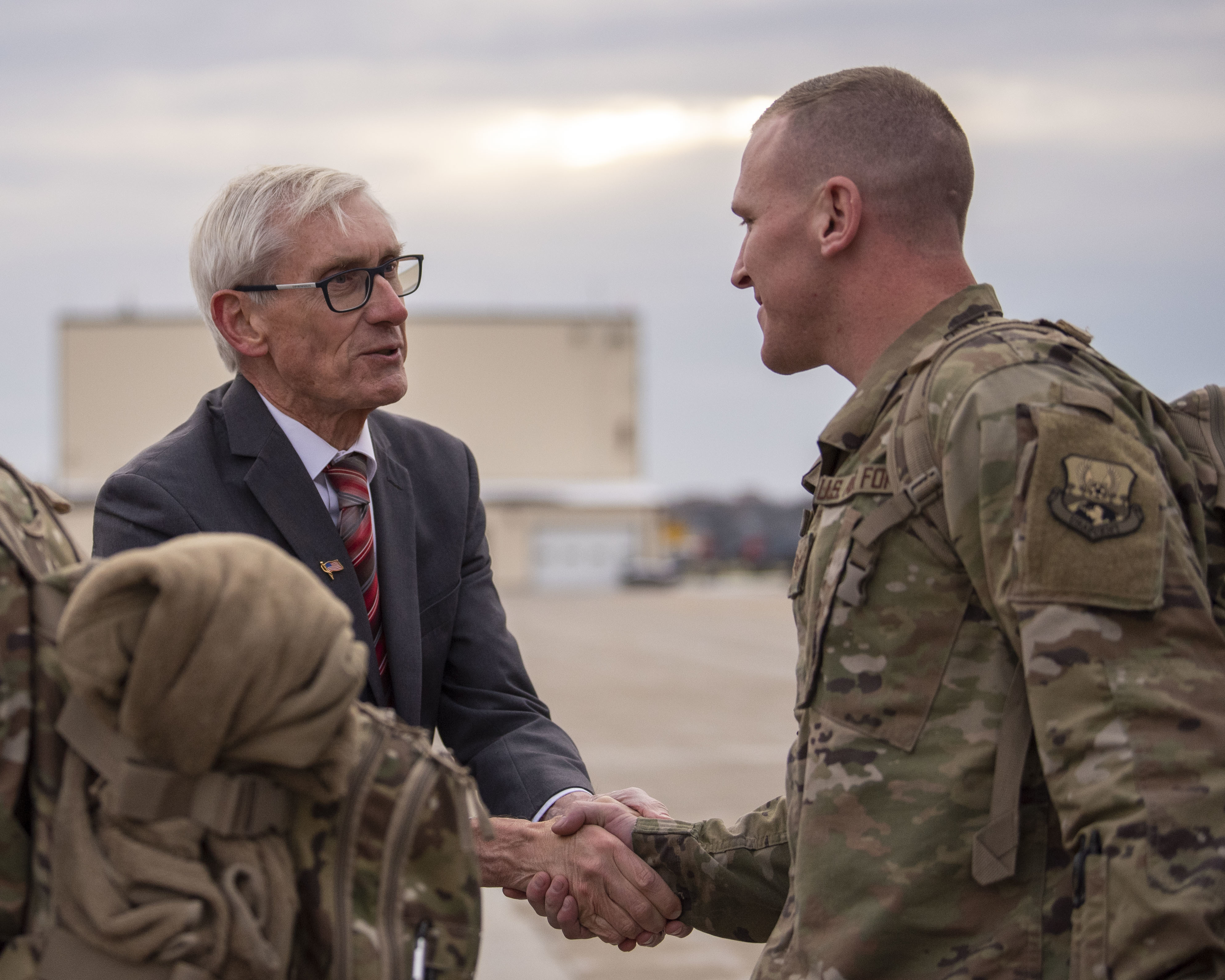
Evers in 2019, greeting a U.S. Air Force troop who was returning from service in Afghanistan

Evers has frequently used his veto power to oppose legislation passed by the Republican-controlled Wisconsin Legislature. He has used it more frequently than any governor in Wisconsin history, and has used line-item veto power to rewrite Republican-authored bills.

Evers's vetoes have included laws related to election procedures, government powers during a pandemic, education, federal aid, redistricting, guns, police and crime, abortion, social welfare programs, and regulations and licensing.

==== Republican efforts to restrict gubernatorial power ====
Before Evers took office, the Republican-led legislature passed new laws weakening the offices of the governor and attorney general. They targeted Evers's authority over economic development issues, required his administration to rewrite thousands of government documents, and required the attorney general to get legislative approval before settling lawsuits. The legislature also restricted voting access. Governor Walker signed all the legislation over Evers's objections. These actions were challenged as unconstitutional, with some voting law changes struck down by a federal district court but later restored by the United States Court of Appeals for the Seventh Circuit.

Also before Evers took office, Walker, the legislature, and the Wisconsin Supreme Court reduced Evers's ability to appoint new administrators. Before leaving office, Walker appointed 82 people and the legislature confirmed them. When a judge declared these appointments unconstitutional, Evers replaced 15 of Walker's appointees. These new appointments were upheld by a Wisconsin Court of Appeals decision but overruled by the Wisconsin Supreme Court. Walker's appointees were reinstated.

The Wisconsin Supreme Court also allowed most of the lame-duck laws the legislature adopted, defeating lawsuits brought by the League of Women Voters and Service Employees International Union. The lawsuits largely hinged on the constitutionality of the legislature holding such votes in "extraordinary sessions"—special sessions not called by the governor. Such sessions are not explicitly authorized by the Constitution of Wisconsin or state law, so litigants contended that the acts of such sessions are not constitutional. The Wisconsin Supreme Court rejected those arguments.

Evers's problems with Republican appointees continued into his term. Late in Evers's first term, many Walker appointees refused to leave office when their terms expired. Evers appointed replacements, but Senate Republicans did not act on the appointments. Evers challenged the holdovers in state court, and the Wisconsin Supreme Court held that appointees whose terms had expired could remain in their positions indefinitely so long as the Senate refused to confirm a replacement. The Senate also rejected a number of Evers's appointees. By March 2024, it had rejected 21 of his appointees; in the previous 40 years, the Senate had rejected four.

In Evers's second term, Republicans sought to enact constitutional amendments to further limit the governor's powers. In 2024, Wisconsin voters were asked to vote on two amendments that would limit the governor's control over state spending. One would invalidate any spending decisions made by the governor or other agency that was not explicitly appropriated by legislation. The other would require legislative approval for usage of any federal funds sent to the state. Voters rejected both amendments in the August 13 primary elections.

==== First term ====
In February 2019, Evers withdrew Wisconsin National Guard forces from the border with Mexico, where President Donald Trump had called for a "national emergency". Evers said, "There is simply not ample evidence to support the president's contention that there exists a national security crisis at our Southwestern border. Therefore, there is no justification for the ongoing presence of Wisconsin National Guard personnel at the border."

In February 2019, Evers's administration prepared a budget proposal that included proposals to legalize the medical use of marijuana for patients with certain conditions, upon the recommendation from a physician or practitioner. Evers also proposed to decriminalize the possession or distribution of 25 grams or less of marijuana in Wisconsin and to repeal the requirement that users of cannabidiol obtain a physician's certification every year. Evers's marijuana proposals were opposed by Republican leaders in the Legislature.

On March 12, 2020, due to the COVID-19 pandemic, Evers declared a public health emergency in the state. The next day, he ordered all schools in the state to close by March 18, with no possibility of reopening until at least April 6. On March 17, Evers instituted a statewide ban on public gatherings of more than 10 people, following an advisory from the federal government. This was expanded to a statewide "safer at home" order on March 25, originally set to expire on April 25, with people allowed to leave their homes only for essential business and exercise.

On April 6, Evers issued an executive order to delay the state's April 7 presidential primary, as well as other coinciding elections. The move followed a dispute with legislative Republicans over whether to delay or otherwise modify in-person voting during the pandemic. Evers had said on April 2 that he had no legal authority to issue such an order, and Republican leaders in the legislature used his own words against him when challenging the order in court. A conservative majority on the Wisconsin Supreme Court blocked the executive order just hours after it was issued on April 6, and the election took place as scheduled on April 7.

On April 16, Evers ordered an extension of the statewide lockdown to May 26, and mandated all schools in the state to remain closed through the end of the academic year. The legislature promptly sued to block the order, and the Wisconsin Supreme Court's conservative majority struck it down on May 13, after Evers's initial state of emergency expired. Evers responded to the suit by accusing legislative Republicans of a "power grab", and said they cared more about political power than people's lives. Republicans have called the extension an "abuse of power".

On April 20, Evers announced a recovery plan called the "Badger Bounce Back", laying out details of his plan for reopening Wisconsin's economy gradually as the pandemic subsides. The plan called for daily death tolls from the virus to drop for 14 continuous days before "phase one" could be initiated.

On July 30, Evers issued a statewide mask mandate in a new attempt to curb the increasing spread of the virus, declaring a new state of emergency in order to do so. Republicans promptly sued, arguing that he had overstepped his power. In February 2021, the legislature voted to repeal the statewide mask mandate. Evers countered by issuing a new statewide mask mandate.

After the shooting of Jacob Blake in Kenosha Evers issued a statement denouncing the excessive use of force by police and invoking the names of African Americans killed by law enforcement. He said, "While we do not have all of the details yet, what we know for certain is that he is not the first Black man or person to have been shot or injured or mercilessly killed at the hands of individuals in law enforcement in our state or our country."

After the subsequent unrest in Kenosha, Evers deployed the Wisconsin National Guard to Kenosha. Looting and damage to vehicles, businesses, and public facilities such as schools, the Dinosaur Discovery Museum, and a public library were reported. Evers also responded by calling state lawmakers into a special session to pass legislation addressing police brutality.

On March 31, 2021, the Wisconsin Supreme Court struck down Evers's mask mandate in a 4–3 ruling, holding that state law did not allow the governor to issue repeated emergency declarations for the same COVID-19 emergency without legislative approval. The Wisconsin Supreme Court had previously struck down the state's May 2020 stay-at-home order; it was the first state supreme court to strike down such lockdown measures.

On April 30, 2021, Evers sought $1.6 billion in federal funds to expand access to Wisconsin's Medicaid program. He also proposed legalizing medical and recreational marijuana, as well as increasing the minimum wage and granting public workers collective bargaining rights. Republicans in the state legislature blocked all the proposals.

==== Second term ====
After Evers's reelection in 2022, funding for local governments became a major issue for Evers and the Legislature. Municipalities of all sizes were struggling to make their budgets, with many threatening deep cuts to police and other services. Evers and the legislature compromised on shared revenue in 2023 Wisconsin Act 12. The law increased state funding for all Wisconsin municipalities by at least 20%, while local governments outside Milwaukee received about 36% more overall. It also authorized the city of Milwaukee and Milwaukee County to impose additional local sales taxes.

In the 2023–2025 budget, Evers used his line-item veto to increase the limit under which school districts could request additional tax levies by referendum. In that budget, he also vetoed an income tax cut for the top two brackets of Wisconsin earners and an attempt to condense Wisconsin's four income tax brackets into three.

Later that year, Evers and the legislature compromised on a funding package for American Family Field amid concern that Milwaukee could lose the Milwaukee Brewers if needed stadium repairs were not funded. The package committed public funding for repairs and required the Brewers to extend their lease through at least 2050.

After the 2024 Wisconsin state legislative elections, Evers called for the creation of a statewide citizen-initiated referendum process.

In his 2025–2027 budget proposal, Evers proposed changing gendered terminology in state laws governing artificial insemination and parentage, including replacing the term "mother" with "inseminated person" in some provisions. Republican lawmakers removed the terminology changes before passing the budget Evers signed. Evers also proposed raising the cost of Wisconsin fishing licenses by $10. Evers and Republican legislative leaders later reached a compromise on the 2025–2027 budget, which Evers signed on July 3, 2025. The $111 billion budget included about $1.4 billion in income-tax cuts, increased funding for special education, child care, and the Universities of Wisconsin, and raised a hospital assessment intended to preserve federal Medicaid matching funds. In May 2026, Evers, Assembly Speaker Robin Vos, and Senate Majority Leader Devin LeMahieu announced a further agreement on tax relief and school funding. The proposal passed the Assembly but failed in the Senate.

In July 2023, Evers used his partial veto authority to extend certain school funding provisions for more than 400 years. The budget bill provided a $325 per-pupil increase in school district revenue limits for the 2023–24 and 2024–25 school years. By striking "20" and the hyphen from "2023–24 and 2024–25", Evers changed the end date to 2425. Wisconsin's partial-veto power permits the governor to remove words, numbers, and punctuation from appropriations bills. Republican lawmakers and business groups challenged the veto, arguing that it violated the state's 1990 "Vanna White" amendment, which limited the governor's ability to create new sentences by combining parts of an appropriations bill. In April 2025, the Wisconsin Supreme Court upheld the veto in a 4–3 decision.

==== 2026 campaign ====
In July 2025, Evers announced he would not run for reelection in the 2026 Wisconsin gubernatorial election.

After announcing his retirement, Evers said he was unlikely to endorse a candidate in the 2026 Democratic gubernatorial primary, adding, "I'll never say never, but I want to make sure who the rest of the candidates are before I even make that decision." Evers remained neutral for a year, as the Democratic primary field swelled to seven major candidates, including four current or former members of Evers's cabinet.

The campaign began to shift after the 2026 Democratic State Convention, in June, when Lieutenant Governor Sara Rodriguez won the convention's informal straw poll. In early July, Milwaukee County executive David Crowley, who had reported strong early fundraising, withdrew from the race and endorsed Rodriguez. But days later, Rodriguez fired her campaign manager and announced significant financial reporting errors, and on July 17 she dropped out of the race. At the time, the Milwaukee Journal Sentinel reported that Evers was "very seriously considering" a plan to bring Crowley back into the race.

On July 18, Crowley reentered the race. On July 19, Evers—who was then on an official trade mission in Ghana—endorsed Crowley. Polling at the time showed Crowley in third place, 30 points behind the frontrunner, state representative Francesca Hong, who identifies as a democratic socialist. Returning to Wisconsin only three weeks before the election, Evers began to campaign alongside Crowley across much of the state. The Crowley campaign announced surging fundraising and a rush of new union endorsements in the campaign's closing days. In the August 11 primary, Crowley prevailed by about 3,700 votes; political media called it a "stunning comeback" and a "big upset". Evers congratulated Crowley in the early hours of August 12, calling him "the future of our party".

Evers campaigned extensively with Crowley in the general election. Crowley won the election with 54% of the vote, the largest margin of victory for a Democrat in a Wisconsin gubernatorial election since 1982. This was the first time since 1962 that a Democratic governor of Wisconsin was succeeded by another Democrat; 1962 was also the last time Wisconsin Democrats won three consecutive gubernatorial elections.

== Political positions ==
=== Abortion ===
In December 2021, as the United States Supreme Court heard oral argument in Dobbs v. Jackson Women's Health Organization, a case that overturned Roe v. Wade, Evers vetoed five bills that would have restricted access to reproductive healthcare in Wisconsin, saying "as long as I'm governor, I will veto any legislation that turns back the clock on reproductive rights in this state—and that's a promise."

Evers has also signed legislation supported by abortion opponents In March 2026, he signed legislation by Republicans Rob Hutton and Rick Gundrum that expanded Wisconsin's safe-haven law. The law raised the age at which an infant may be relinquished from 72 hours to 30 days and also authorized the use of newborn infant safety devices. Wisconsin Right to Life applauded the law.

=== Education ===
During his 2018 campaign, Evers said he supported more funding for K-12 education and wanted to work with Republicans to do more to help underperforming schools. He would like to expand Pre-K education to all students and continue the freeze of the in-state tuition price for higher education.

In July 2023, Evers made a line-item veto to the state budget for fiscal years 2024 and 2025 that enshrined per pupil increases in school funding of $325 a year until 2425. He did this by striking the hyphen and "20"s from where the budget bill mentioned the 2024–2025 school year. In April 2025, the Wisconsin Supreme Court upheld the validity of this veto; in the majority opinion, justice Jill Karofsky wrote that partial veto power is not constitutionally limited by "how much or how little the partial vetoes change policy, even when that change is considerable".

=== Gerrymandering ===
Evers has criticized Wisconsin's legislative maps as "some of the most gerrymandered, extreme maps in the United States", citing as evidence the fact that the state legislature has opposed policies such as legalizing marijuana and expanding Medicaid despite polls showing that a majority of Wisconsinites support both. In January 2020, he created a nonpartisan redistricting commission by executive order with the intent of drawing an alternative map proposal for post-2020 census redistricting to counter the proposal the Republican-controlled legislature has said it will put forward if the issue ends up in the state's court system, as it has under past periods of divided government in Wisconsin.

With the maps stuck in legislative gridlock, both sides sought relief from the courts. The Democrats sued in federal court; federal courts had handled redistricting in Wisconsin every time it had hit gridlock for the past 60 years. Republicans petitioned the Wisconsin Supreme Court, which had not handled a redistricting decision since 1964. The Court, with a 4–3 conservative majority, chose to assume jurisdiction and soon articulated that it would pursue a map with the least changes necessary from the existing one to bring it into compliance with the 2020 census figures. Complying with the Court's rules, Evers and legislative Republicans each submitted maps with only minor changes to the 2011 map. Either map would have left Republicans with significant structural advantages in the legislative elections. But Evers's map better complied with the Court's "least changes" rule, and so the Court's swing vote, Justice Brian Hagedorn, sided with the Court's three liberals to adopt it. Republicans appealed the decision to the United States Supreme Court, which struck down the legislative map in an unsigned opinion, criticizing the flawed process the Wisconsin Supreme Court had used, saying that it failed to properly consider minority representation issues that arose from Evers's map. But the high court did allow Evers's least-change congressional map to stand, since it had no VRA implications. On remand, Hagedorn sided with the court's three conservatives to reject Evers's map and select the Republican alternative. This map was used for the 2022 elections.

In April 2023, Janet Protasiewicz was elected to the Wisconsin Supreme Court, flipping the majority to the liberals. Democratic-aligned interest groups brought new lawsuits, challenging the constitutionality of the 2022 legislative districts. In Clarke v. Wisconsin Elections Commission, the Court struck down the 2022 map on technical grounds and also found that the "least changes" rule had no basis in Wisconsin law or precedent and was therefore invalid. Evers was one of six parties to the lawsuit who proposed remedial redistricting plans. Court-hired consultants soon ruled out the two Republican proposals, saying they were both still gerrymanders. With the Court poised to select one of the four Democratic plans, Republicans in the legislature chose to embrace Evers's proposal. They first passed an amended version of the plan, seeking to protect a handful of incumbents, but Evers vetoed it. Republicans then passed Evers's original map without changes, and Evers signed it into law on February 19, 2024.

Evers also joined a lawsuit in the Wisconsin Supreme Court challenging the 2022 congressional district map. That map had been created using the Court's now discredited "least changes" rule, so Democratic-aligned litigants argued that it should also be reconsidered. The Court refused this case without explaining its reasoning.

=== Gun control ===
Evers supports universal background checks for gun purchases. He has also supported an extreme risk protection order act, commonly known as a "red flag law", which would permit family members or police to petition a court to temporarily remove firearms from a person found to pose a danger to themselves or others. Following the December 2024 shooting at Abundant Life Christian School, Evers created a statewide Office of Violence Prevention with $10 million in federal funding. In his 2025 State of the State address, he renewed calls for universal background checks and a red flag law and also proposed a ban on untraceable "ghost guns".

=== Health care ===
Evers has said that Scott Walker's decisions about health care in Wisconsin led to higher insurance premiums for residents. He has pointed out that Minnesota accepted a Medicaid expansion and has been more proactive about healthcare overall, resulting in insurance premiums 47% lower than Wisconsin's. Evers supports legislation that would protect residents from higher costs for health insurance due to old age or preexisting conditions. He also supports allowing people to stay on their parents' health insurance plans until age 26. After taking office, Evers directed Attorney General Josh Kaul to withdraw Wisconsin from the multistate lawsuit challenging the Affordable Care Act; the state was dismissed from the case in April 2019.

Using funds from the Infrastructure Investment and Jobs Act and the state Safe Drinking Water Loan Program, Evers's administration allocated more than $402 million in 2023 for drinking-water infrastructure, including lead-service-line replacement and projects addressing contaminants such as PFAS.

=== Immigration ===
Evers supports permitting undocumented immigrants living in Wisconsin to obtain driver's licenses, and has called this position "common sense".

In December 2019, in response to Trump's executive order requiring states' consent for refugee resettlement, Evers sent the administration a letter stating that Wisconsin would accept refugees, calling them "part of the fabric of [the] state", and criticizing Trump's refugee policies as "overly cumbersome and inappropriate". In February 2020, Evers sent U.S. Secretary of State Mike Pompeo a letter asking him to halt negotiations with the government of Laos regarding deportations of Wisconsin's Hmong refugee population, who had previously been protected from deportation due to a long record of human rights violations in Laos. In April 2026, Evers signed 2025 Wisconsin Act 240, which allows recipients of Deferred Action for Childhood Arrivals to obtain state occupational credentials if they otherwise meet licensing requirements.

=== Income tax ===
During the 2018 campaign, Evers proposed to cut income tax by 10% for Wisconsin residents who earn less than $100,000 per year. He also pledged not to raise taxes, saying, "I'm planning to raise no taxes." Evers's first budget proposal in 2019 increased taxes by $1.3 billion, about 1.5% of the $83 billion state budget. His second proposal reduced his proposed tax increase to $1 billion. Evers's tax increase included raising the gas tax, but the billion-dollar increase in state tax revenue came from reducing tax credits available to large manufacturers and wealthy tax filers with capital gains earnings of more than $300,000 per year. In later years, Evers fulfilled his proposal to cut income taxes by 10% making several line-item vetoes to specific elements, but largely leaving the budget as it was proposed by state Republicans.

=== Infrastructure ===
While campaigning for governor, Evers promised to focus on improving roads and bridges. In March 2024, he signed bipartisan bills to increase electric vehicle charging stations.

=== LGBT rights ===
In June 2019, Evers issued an executive order to fly the rainbow flag over the Wisconsin State Capitol for Pride Month, the first time the rainbow flag had flown over the building.

On December 6, 2023, Evers vetoed a bill banning gender-affirming care for minors. He wrote in his veto message, "This type of legislation, and the rhetoric beget by pursuing it, harms LGBTQ people and kids' mental health, emboldens anti-LGBTQ hate and violence, and threatens the safety and dignity of LGBTQ Wisconsinites". Evers said, "I will veto any bill that makes Wisconsin a less safe, less inclusive, and less welcoming place for LGBTQ people and kids."

In April 2024, Evers vetoed a bill that would have barred transgender high school athletes from competing on teams that align with their gender identity. In March 2026, he vetoed five additional bills that would have restricted transgender health care or participation in school sports.

=== Marijuana legalization ===
Having campaigned on his support of cannabis in Wisconsin, Evers announced in January 2019 the inclusion of medical marijuana in his state budget as a "first step" toward legalization. On February 7, he announced he would propose legalizing recreational marijuana in his 2021–2023 biennial budget.

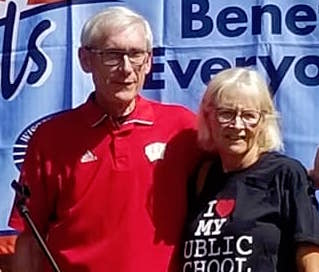
Tony and Kathy Evers in 2018

Republican legislative leaders have opposed Evers's proposals to legalize recreational marijuana, while some Republicans have supported more limited medical-marijuana legislation. Evers again included recreational and medical marijuana legalization in his 2025–2027 budget proposal, but the Republican-controlled Joint Finance Committee removed the proposal in May 2025.

== Personal life ==
Evers and his wife, Kathy, have three adult children and nine grandchildren.

Evers had esophageal cancer before undergoing surgery in 2008.

== Electoral history ==
=== Superintendent of Public Instruction (1993) ===
Evers first ran for Superintendent of Public Instruction in 1993, losing in an election won by John Benson.

=== Superintendent of Public Instruction (2001) ===
Wisconsin Superintendent of Public Instruction Election, 2001
Party	Candidate	Votes	%	±%
Nonpartisan Primary, February 20, 2001
Independent	Linda Cross	58,258	23.18%	
Independent	Elizabeth Burmaster	55,327	22.01%	
Independent	Tony Evers	45,575	18.13%	
Independent	Jonathan Barry	36,135	14.38%	
Independent	Tom Balistreri	33,531	13.34%	
Independent	Dean Gagnon	15,261	6.07%	
Independent	Julie Theis	6,783	2.70%	
	Scattering	458	0.18%	
Total votes		251,328	100.0%	

=== Superintendent of Public Instruction (2009–2017) ===
Wisconsin Superintendent of Public Instruction Election, 2009
Party	Candidate	Votes	%	±%
Nonpartisan Primary, February 17, 2009
Independent	Tony Evers	89,883	34.99%	
Independent	Rose Fernandez	79,757	31.04%	
Independent	Van Mobley	34,940	13.60%	
Independent	Todd Price	28,927	11.26%	
Independent	Lowell Holtz	22,373	8.71%	
	Scattering	1,431	0.18%	+0.06%
Total votes		256,909	100.0%	+7.89%
General Election, April 7, 2009
Independent	Tony Evers	439,248	57.14%	
Independent	Rose Fernandez	328,511	42.74%	
	Scattering	905	0.12%	+0.02%
Total votes		768,664	100.0%	+6.22%

Wisconsin Superintendent of Public Instruction Election, 2013
Party	Candidate	Votes	%	±%
General Election, April 2, 2013
Independent	Tony Evers (incumbent)	487,030	61.15%	+4.01%
Independent	Don Pridemore	308,050	38.67%	
	Scattering	1,431	0.18%	+0.06%
Plurality		178,980	22.47%	
Total votes		796,511	100.0%	+3.62%

Wisconsin Superintendent of Public Instruction Election, 2017
Party	Candidate	Votes	%	±%
Nonpartisan Primary, February 21, 2017
Independent	Tony Evers (incumbent)	255,552	69.43%	
Independent	Lowell E. Holtz	84,398	22.93%	
Independent	John Humphries	27,066	7.35%	
Independent	Rick Melcher (Write-in)	377	0.10%	
	Scattering	703	0.19%	
Total votes		368,096	100.0%	
General Election, April 4, 2017
Independent	Tony Evers (incumbent)	494,793	69.86%	+7.71%
Independent	Lowell E. Holtz	212,504	30.00%	
Independent	Rick Melcher	62	0.01%	
	Scattering	930	0.13%	−0.04%
Plurality		282,289	39.86%	+17.39%
Total votes		708,289	100.0%	-11.08%

=== Wisconsin Governor (2018, 2022) ===
Year	Election	Date	Elected				Defeated				Total	Plurality
2018	Primary	Aug. 14	Tony Evers	Democratic	225,082	41.77%	Mahlon Mitchell	Dem.	87,926	16.32%	538,857	137,156
2018	Primary	Aug. 14	Tony Evers	Democratic	225,082	41.77%	Kelda Roys	Dem.	69,086	12.82%	538,857	137,156
2018	Primary	Aug. 14	Tony Evers	Democratic	225,082	41.77%	Kathleen Vinehout	Dem.	44,168	8.20%	538,857	137,156
2018	Primary	Aug. 14	Tony Evers	Democratic	225,082	41.77%	Mike McCabe	Dem.	39,885	7.40%	538,857	137,156
2018	Primary	Aug. 14	Tony Evers	Democratic	225,082	41.77%	Matt Flynn	Dem.	31,580	5.86%	538,857	137,156
2018	Primary	Aug. 14	Tony Evers	Democratic	225,082	41.77%	Paul Soglin	Dem.	28,158	5.23%	538,857	137,156
2018	Primary	Aug. 14	Tony Evers	Democratic	225,082	41.77%	Andy Gronik (withdrawn)	Dem.	6,627	1.23%	538,857	137,156
2018	Primary	Aug. 14	Tony Evers	Democratic	225,082	41.77%	Dana Wachs (withdrawn)	Dem.	4,216	0.78%	538,857	137,156
2018	Primary	Aug. 14	Tony Evers	Democratic	225,082	41.77%	Josh Pade	Dem.	1,908	0.35%	538,857	137,156
2018	Primary	Aug. 14	Tony Evers	Democratic	225,082	41.77%	Paul Boucher (write-in)	Dem.	10	0.00%	538,857	137,156
2018	General	Nov. 6	Tony Evers; Mandela Barnes	Democratic	1,324,307	49.54%	Scott Walker (inc); Rebecca Kleefisch (inc)	Rep.	1,295,080	48.44%	2,673,308	29,227
2018	General	Nov. 6	Tony Evers; Mandela Barnes	Democratic	1,324,307	49.54%	Phil Anderson; Patrick Baird	Lib.	20,225	0.76%	2,673,308	29,227
2018	General	Nov. 6	Tony Evers; Mandela Barnes	Democratic	1,324,307	49.54%	Margaret Turnbull; Wil Losch	Ind.	18,884	0.71%	2,673,308	29,227
2018	General	Nov. 6	Tony Evers; Mandela Barnes	Democratic	1,324,307	49.54%	Michael J. White; Tiffany Anderson	Grn.	11,087	0.41%	2,673,308	29,227
2018	General	Nov. 6	Tony Evers; Mandela Barnes	Democratic	1,324,307	49.54%	Arnie Enz; N/A	Ind.	2,745	0.10%	2,673,308	29,227
2018	General	Nov. 6	Tony Evers; Mandela Barnes	Democratic	1,324,307	49.54%	Ryan Cason (write-in); N/A	Rep.	4	0.00%	2,673,308	29,227
2018	General	Nov. 6	Tony Evers; Mandela Barnes	Democratic	1,324,307	49.54%	N/A; William Henry Davis III (write-in)	Dem.	3	0.00%	2,673,308	29,227
2018	General	Nov. 6	Tony Evers; Mandela Barnes	Democratic	1,324,307	49.54%	Mark S. Grimek (write-in); N/A	Con.	2	0.00%	2,673,308	29,227
2018	General	Nov. 6	Tony Evers; Mandela Barnes	Democratic	1,324,307	49.54%	Richard M. Turtenwald (write-in); N/A	Ind.	2	0.00%	2,673,308	29,227
2018	General	Nov. 6	Tony Evers; Mandela Barnes	Democratic	1,324,307	49.54%	Paul Boucher (write-in); N/A	Dem.	1	0.00%	2,673,308	29,227
2018	General	Nov. 6	Tony Evers; Mandela Barnes	Democratic	1,324,307	49.54%	Robbie Hoffman (write-in); N/A	Ind.	1	0.00%	2,673,308	29,227
2018	General	Nov. 6	Tony Evers; Mandela Barnes	Democratic	1,324,307	49.54%	N/A; Corban Gehler (write-in)	Dem.	1	0.00%	2,673,308	29,227
2022	General	Nov. 8	Tony Evers (inc); Sara Rodriguez	Democratic	1,358,774	51.15%	Tim Michels; Roger Roth	Rep.	1,268,535	47.75%	2,656,490	90,239
2022	General	Nov. 8	Tony Evers (inc); Sara Rodriguez	Democratic	1,358,774	51.15%	Joan Ellis Beglinger (withdrawn); N/A	Ind.	27,198	1.02%	2,656,490	90,239
2022	General	Nov. 8	Tony Evers (inc); Sara Rodriguez	Democratic	1,358,774	51.15%	Seth Haskin; N/A	Ind.	104	0.00%	2,656,490	90,239

== See also ==
- Governor of Wisconsin
  - List of governors of Wisconsin
- Superintendent of Public Instruction of Wisconsin
  - List of superintendents of public instruction of Wisconsin

Political offices
Preceded by Elizabeth Burmaster	Wisconsin Superintendent of Public Instruction; 2009–2019	Succeeded by Carolyn Stanford Taylor
Preceded by Scott Walker	Governor of Wisconsin; 2019–present	Incumbent
Party political offices
Preceded by Mary Burke	Democratic nominee for Governor of Wisconsin; 2018, 2022	Succeeded by David Crowley
U.S. order of precedence (ceremonial)
Preceded by JD Vance as Vice President	Order of precedence of the United States; Within Wisconsin	Succeeded by Mayor of city in which event is held
Preceded by JD Vance as Vice President	Order of precedence of the United States; Within Wisconsin	Succeeded by Otherwise Mike Johnson as Speaker of the House
Preceded by Kim Reynolds as Governor of Iowa	Order of precedence of the United States; Outside Wisconsin	Succeeded by Gavin Newsom as Governor of California
