= Rhinelander, Wisconsin =

- City
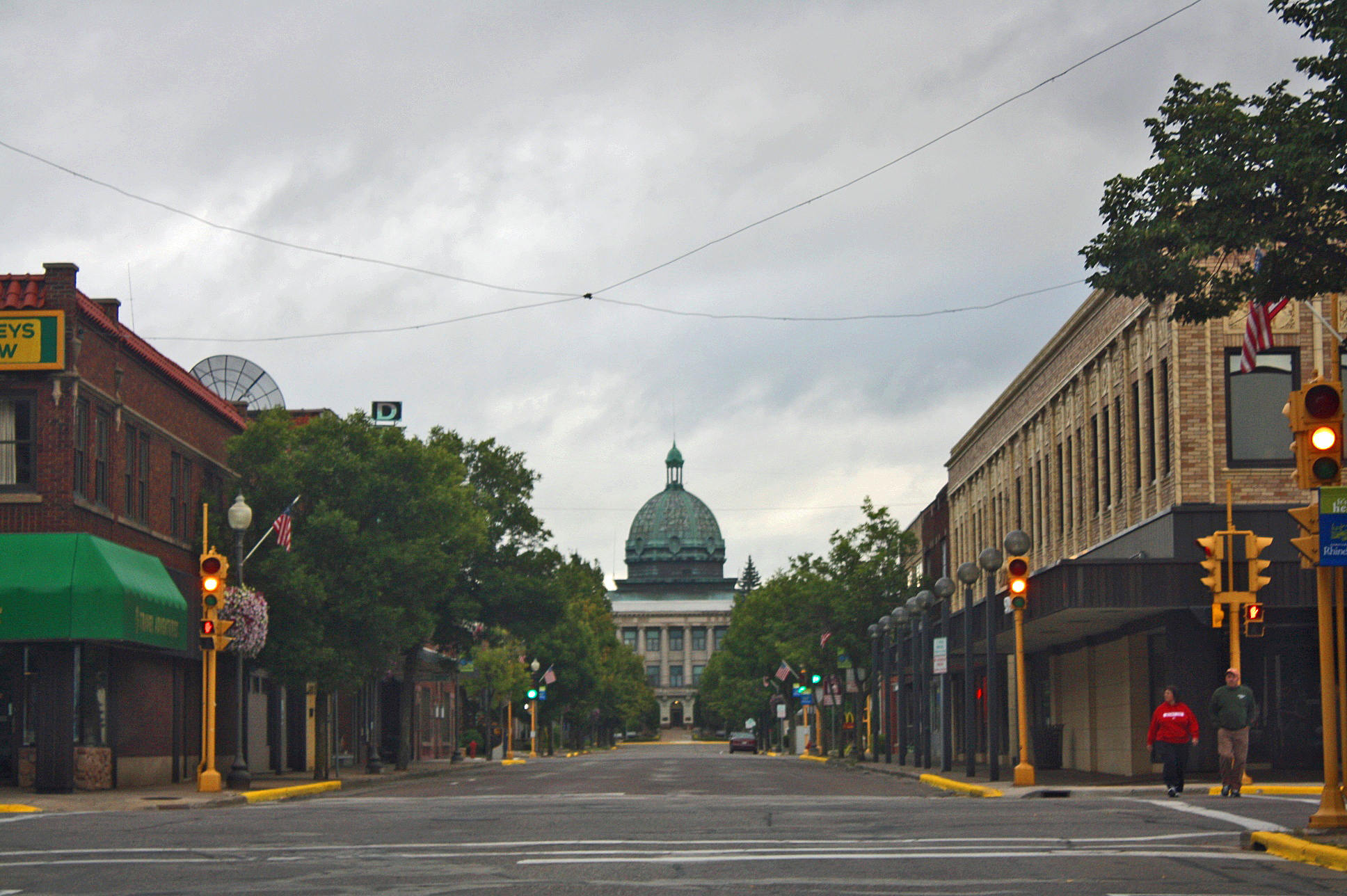
- Looking east at downtown Rhinelander with view of the Oneida County Courthouse dome
- Interactive map of Rhinelander, Wisconsin
- Location within Wisconsin Location within the United States
- Coordinates: 45°38′22″N 89°24′44″W
- Country: United States
- State: Wisconsin
- County: Oneida

Area
  - Total: 8.68 sq mi (22.47 km^{2})
  - Land: 8.42 sq mi (21.82 km^{2})
  - Water: 0.25 sq mi (0.65 km^{2})
- Elevation: 1,549 ft (472 m)

Population (2020)
  - Total: 8,285
  - Density: 984/sq mi (379.8/km^{2})
- Time zone: UTC−6 (Central (CST))
  - Summer (DST): UTC−5 (CDT)
- Zip Code: 54501
- Area codes: 715 & 534
- FIPS code: 55-67200
- GNIS feature ID: 1572231
- Website: www.rhinelanderwi.us

Rhinelander is a city in Oneida County, Wisconsin, United States, and its county seat. The population was 8,285 at the 2020 census.

== History ==
The area that eventually became the city of Rhinelander was originally called Pelican Rapids by early settlers, named for the stretch of rapids just above the convergence of the Wisconsin and Pelican Rivers. Around 1870, Anderson W. Brown of Stevens Point and Anson P. Vaughn traveled up the Wisconsin River to cruise timber for Brown's father, E. D. Brown. Upon arriving at the meeting point of the Wisconsin and Pelican Rivers at the site of John Curran's trading post, and seeing high banks along the rapids and excellent pine stands, Anderson Brown envisioned a town with a lumber mill powered by the waters of the Wisconsin River. Brown's vision did not come to fruition for some years, but after subsequent expeditions with others, including his brother and Rhinelander's first mayor, Webster Brown, the brothers managed to convince their father and uncle to purchase the land from the federal government and build a town.

In its charter, the city was named Rhinelander after Frederic W. Rhinelander of New York, who was president of the Milwaukee, Lake Shore and Western Railway at the time. This was part of a bid by the Brown brothers to induce the railroad to extend a spur to the location to further their lumbering business. Ultimately, after over ten years of negotiations, the Brown family agreed to convey half their land holdings in the area to the railroad in exchange for a rail line to their future city. In 1882, the railroad line from present-day Monico to Rhinelander was completed, jump-starting the development of Rhinelander as the commercial hub of the region.

== Geography ==
According to the United States Census Bureau, the city has a total area of 8.61 square miles (22.30 km^{2}), of which 8.34 square miles (21.60 km^{2}) are land and 0.27 sq mi (0.70 km^{2}) is covered by water.

Due to having similar terrain as the Soviet Union, the city was frequently used for practice radar bombing during the Cold War.

=== Climate ===
Rhinelander has a warm-summer humid continental climate (Köppen: Dfb). Because of its location, it is prone to Arctic cold snaps, and without the western Föhn winds its winter average is lower than other places in the US at 45 °N even at high elevations. Summers tend to be cooler with some degree of Lake Superior and Lake Michigan influence. Precipitation is still relatively distributed but not as much as other humid climates in the country.

Climate data for Rhinelander, Wisconsin (1991–2020 normals, extremes 1893–present)
Month	Jan	Feb	Mar	Apr	May	Jun	Jul	Aug	Sep	Oct	Nov	Dec	Year
Record high °F (°C)	53 (12)	64 (18)	78 (26)	92 (33)	99 (37)	104 (40)	108 (42)	97 (36)	98 (37)	92 (33)	79 (26)	62 (17)	108 (42)
Mean daily maximum °F (°C)	21.1 (−6.1)	26.0 (−3.3)	37.6 (3.1)	50.7 (10.4)	64.9 (18.3)	73.9 (23.3)	78.0 (25.6)	75.9 (24.4)	68.1 (20.1)	53.9 (12.2)	38.1 (3.4)	26.0 (−3.3)	51.2 (10.7)
Daily mean °F (°C)	10.8 (−11.8)	13.9 (−10.1)	25.4 (−3.7)	38.7 (3.7)	52.6 (11.4)	62.1 (16.7)	66.3 (19.1)	64.3 (17.9)	56.3 (13.5)	43.3 (6.3)	29.4 (−1.4)	17.3 (−8.2)	40.0 (4.4)
Mean daily minimum °F (°C)	0.4 (−17.6)	1.9 (−16.7)	13.2 (−10.4)	26.7 (−2.9)	40.3 (4.6)	50.3 (10.2)	54.5 (12.5)	52.6 (11.4)	44.6 (7.0)	32.8 (0.4)	20.7 (−6.3)	8.6 (−13.0)	28.9 (−1.7)
Record low °F (°C)	−41 (−41)	−42 (−41)	−36 (−38)	−11 (−24)	18 (−8)	25 (−4)	31 (−1)	28 (−2)	21 (−6)	2 (−17)	−16 (−27)	−34 (−37)	−42 (−41)
Average precipitation inches (mm)	1.22 (31)	1.16 (29)	1.80 (46)	2.97 (75)	3.77 (96)	4.52 (115)	4.39 (112)	3.50 (89)	4.12 (105)	3.38 (86)	1.95 (50)	1.58 (40)	34.36 (873)
Average snowfall inches (cm)	12.0 (30)	12.3 (31)	7.5 (19)	7.4 (19)	0.1 (0.25)	0.0 (0.0)	0.0 (0.0)	0.0 (0.0)	0.0 (0.0)	1.1 (2.8)	7.0 (18)	14.8 (38)	62.2 (158)
Average precipitation days (≥ 0.01 in)	10.5	7.9	8.6	10.8	13.1	12.7	11.3	10.7	11.4	12.8	10.2	10.9	130.9
Average snowy days (≥ 0.1 in)	9.1	6.8	4.3	2.4	0.1	0.0	0.0	0.0	0.0	0.7	4.7	8.6	36.7
Source: NOAA

== Demographics ==
Historical population
Census	Pop.	Note	%±
1890	2,658		—
1900	4,998		88.0%
1910	5,637		12.8%
1920	6,654		18.0%
1930	8,019		20.5%
1940	8,501		6.0%
1950	8,774		3.2%
1960	8,790		0.2%
1970	8,218		−6.5%
1980	7,873		−4.2%
1990	7,427		−5.7%
2000	7,735		4.1%
2010	7,798		0.8%
2020	8,285		6.2%
U.S. Decennial Census

=== 2020 census ===
As of the census of 2020, the population was 8,285. The population density was 983.6 inhabitants per square mile (379.8/km^{2}). There were 4,123 housing units at an average density of 489.5 per square mile (189.0/km^{2}). The racial makeup of the city was 90.8% White, 1.6% Native American, 1.2% Black or African American, 0.8% Asian, 0.1% Pacific Islander, 0.8% from other races, and 4.7% from two or more races. Ethnically, the population was 2.5% Hispanic or Latino of any race.

=== 2010 census ===
As of the census of 2010, 7,798 people, 3,545 households, and 1,876 families resided in the city. The population density was 935.0 inhabitants per square mile (361.0/km^{2}). The 3,981 housing units averaged 477.3 per square mile (184.3/km^{2}). The racial makeup of the city was 95.2% White, 1.0% African American, 1.2% Native American, 0.7% Asian, 0.2% from other races, and 1.6% from two or more races. Hispanics or Latinos of any race were 1.3% of the population.

Of the 3,545 households, 26.9% had children under the age of 18 living with them, 34.6% were married couples living together, 13.5% had a female householder with no husband present, 4.9% had a male householder with no wife present, and 47.1% were not families. About 39.5% of all households were made up of individuals, and 17.1% had someone living alone who was 65 years of age or older. The average household size was 2.10 and the average family size was 2.79.

The median age in the city was 40 years; 21.2% of residents were under the age of 18; 9.5% were between the ages of 18 and 24; 25% were from 25 to 44; 25% were from 45 to 64; and 19.1% were 65 years of age or older. The gender makeup of the city was 47.0% male and 53.0% female.

=== 2000 census ===
As of the census of 2000, 7,735 people, 3,214 households, and 1,860 families resided in the city. The population density was 1,002.5 people per square mile (386.9/km^{2}). The 3,430 housing units averaged 444.5 per square mile (171.5/km^{2}). The racial makeup of the city was 96.83% White, 0.39% African American, 0.96% Native American, 0.32% Asian, 0.12% Pacific Islander, 0.23% from other races, and 1.15% from two or more races. Hispanics or Latinos of any race were 0.72% of the population.

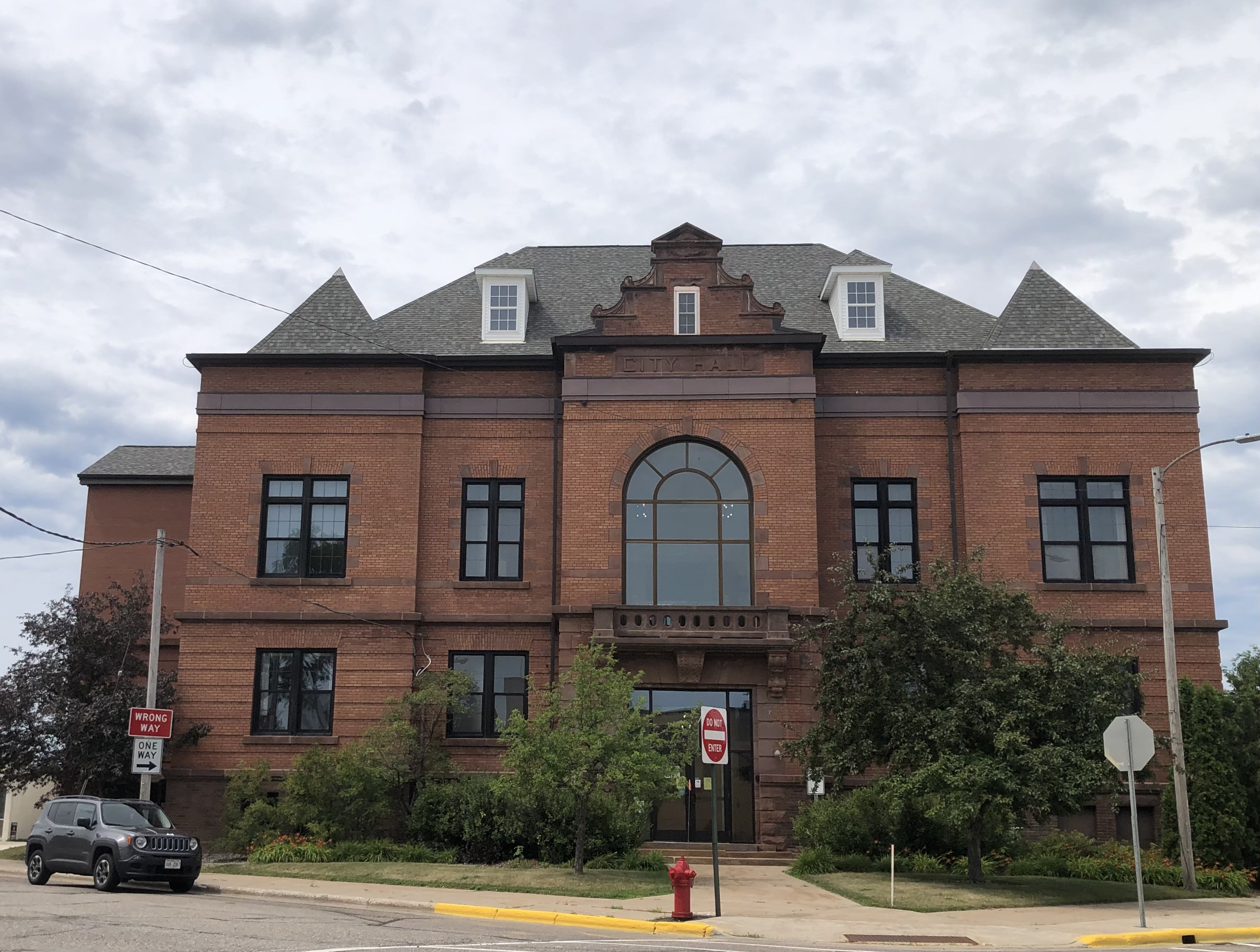
Rhinelander's city hall

Of the 3,214 households, 28.9% had children under the age of 18 living with them, 41.2% were married couples living together, 12.3% had a female householder with no husband present, and 42.1% were not families. About 36.3% of all households were made up of individuals, and 17.7% had someone living alone who was 65 years of age or older. The average household size was 2.23 and the average family size was 2.90.

In the city, the population was distributed as 23.4% under the age of 18, 8.3% from 18 to 24, 27.7% from 25 to 44, 20.1% from 45 to 64, and 20.5% who were 65 years of age or older. The median age was 39 years. For every 100 females, there were 84.1 males. For every 100 females age 18 and over, there were 80.3 males.

The median income for a household in the city was $29,622, and for a family was $37,629. Males had a median income of $29,750 versus $22,157 for females. The per capita income for the city was $16,047. About 9.4% of families and 12.2% of the population were below the poverty line, including 11.1% of those under age 18 and 9.3% of those age 65 or over.

== Economy ==
Rhinelander is a commercial, industrial, and recreation hub for the Northwoods area of Wisconsin. Because of the forests, lakes, and trails in the area, it is both a summer and winter vacation destination. It has a paper mill and a hospital.

The Rhinelander area has numerous vacation destinations, offering fishing, boating, canoeing, kayaking, ATVing, mountain biking and hiking, hunting, golfing, cross country skiing and snowshoeing, snowmobiling, and bird watching. It also serves as a main shopping and lodging area for the Northwoods. A popular summer tourist destination is the Pioneer Park Historical Complex, which is open Memorial Day weekend through Labor Day weekend and features many interactive displays and spaces to explore Rhinelander's rich history.

== Arts and culture ==
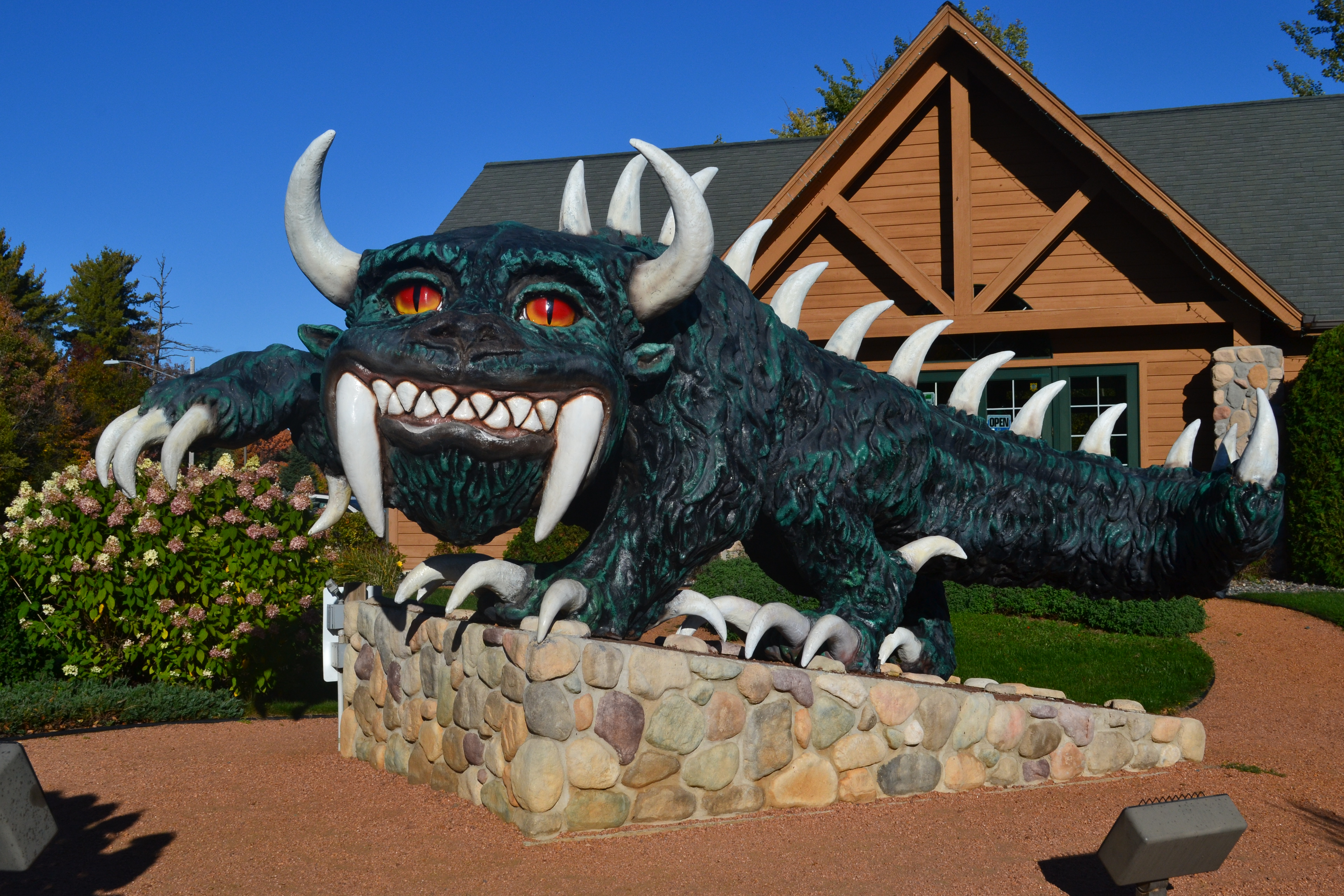
A modern statue of the hodag on display in front of the Rhinelander Chamber of Commerce

Rhinelander is the home of the hodag, a folkloric green and white creature said to stalk the local woods. The hodag serves as mascot for the city and for Rhinelander High School and Northwoods Community Secondary School.

- The Rhinelander Flea Market is held every Wednesday between Labor Day and Memorial Day by the ice arena.
- An arts and cultural center is in the former Federal Building downtown.
- Rhinelander is home to the Hodag Country Festival, a country music festival.
- Northwoods Pride Festival
- Oneida County Fair
- Oktoberfest
- Rhinelander is home to Sirencon, an event held at the Tesomas Scout Camp where siren hobbyists from around the world gather.

=== Museums ===
- ArtStart Art Museum
- CCC (Civilian Conservation Corps) Museum
- Logging Museum
- Rhinelander Historical Society Museum
- Rhinelander School Museum

== Parks and recreation ==
- Hodag Park
- Pioneer Park
- Shepard Park
- West Side Park

=== Golf ===
- Northwood Golf Course
- Rhinelander Country Club

== Government ==
Rhinelander is the county seat for Oneida County. Kristopher Hanus is the current mayor.

Presidential election results

Presidential election results
Year	Republican	Democratic	Third parties
2024	48.7% 1,895	49.5% 1,926	1.7% 67
2020	45.8% 1,775	51.8% 2,007	2.3% 91
2016	44.8% 1,504	45.9% 1,540	9.2% 310
2012	36.8% 1,303	61.5% 2,173	1.7% 60
2008	32.1% 1,242	66.0% 2,554	1.9% 74
2004	42.4% 1,622	56.3% 2,152	1.3% 49
2000	41.1% 1,363	53.0% 1,757	5.9% 196

== Education ==
- The School District of Rhinelander serves the area.
- Zion Lutheran School is a Christian Pre-K-8 school of the Wisconsin Evangelical Lutheran Synod in Rhinelander.
- Nativity of our Lord Catholic School is a pre-K-8 school of the Diocese of Superior.
- The Lake Julia campus of Nicolet Area Technical College is located just outside Rhinelander.
- A University of Wisconsin program, School of the Arts at Rhinelander, took place every summer for 52 years, ending in 2015.

== Media ==
Rhinelander is home to, and the city of license for, NBC network affiliate WJFW-TV (channel 12). In addition to serving Rhinelander, WJFW-TV also serves the Wausau area. Conversely, Wausau's area stations, including CBS affiliate WSAW-TV (channel 7), and ABC affiliate WAOW (channel 9), also serve Rhinelander. WXPR, a public radio station at 91.7 FM, is based in Rhinelander.

The Rhinelander Daily News was the city's paper until 2011, when it was merged with the The Northwoods River News.

== Transportation ==
=== Major highways ===
U.S. 8 runs eastbound to Crandon. Westbound, US 8 routes to Prentice.
WIS 17 travels north to Eagle River and south to Merrill. This route is on the eastern side of Rhinelander.
WIS 47 runs north to Woodruff and south to Antigo.

=== Airport ===
Rhinelander-Oneida County Airport (KRHI) serves Rhinelander and the surrounding Oneida County communities with both scheduled commercial jet service and general aviation services. Located two miles west of the city, the airport handles about 24,958 operations per year, with around 88% general aviation, 6% scheduled commercial air service, and 6% air taxi. The airport has a 6,800-ft concrete primary runway with approved ILS, GPS and VOR/DME approaches (runway 9-27) and a 5,201-ft asphalt crosswind runway with approved GPS approaches (runway 15-33). In addition, the Rhinelander VORTAC (RHI) navigational facility is located on the field.

== Notable people ==
- Douglas Anderson, Wisconsin State Representative
- Deming Bronson, Medal of Honor recipient
- Webster E. Brown, U.S. Representative
- Elizabeth Burmaster, Wisconsin Superintendent of Public Instruction and former president of Nicolet Area Technical College
- Jason Doering, former professional football player for the Indianapolis Colts and the New York Giants
- Darrell Einertson, MLB player
- Dan Forsman, professional golfer, winner of five PGA Tour events
- Clarence W. Gilley, Wisconsin State Representative
- Kathryn Givney, stage and film actress
- Rita Gross, theologian, educator, and writer; grew up on a dairy farm in the Rhinelander area
- John Heisman, college football's Heisman Trophy namesake; buried in Rhinelander; honored by a wooden statue at the Rhinelander-Oneida County Airport
- Walt Kichefski, NFL player
- Michael Knetter, economist and former dean of the Wisconsin School of Business.
- John Kotz, 1941 NCAA Tournament Most Outstanding Player
- Craig Ludwig, former professional hockey player
- Ashlee Martinson, convicted of murdering her mother and stepfather in 2015
- Neil McEachin, Wisconsin State Representative and judge
- Bernard N. Moran, Wisconsin State Senator
- Alvin E. O'Konski, U.S. Representative
- T. V. Olsen, author
- Parker Retzlaff, NASCAR driver
- Arthur M. Rogers, Wisconsin State Representative
- Richard J. Saykally, professor of chemistry, University of California, Berkeley; born in Rhinelander
- Justin O. Schmidt, entomologist, creator of the Schmidt sting pain index
- Vanessa Semrow, Miss Wisconsin Teen USA 2002, Miss Teen USA 2002
- Joan Valerie, film actress
- John C. Van Hollen, Wisconsin politician and realtor
- Robert Vito, television journalist
- Dale Wasserman, playwright
- Mike Webster, Pro Football Hall of Fame member
- Jean M. Wilkowski, diplomat

== Images ==
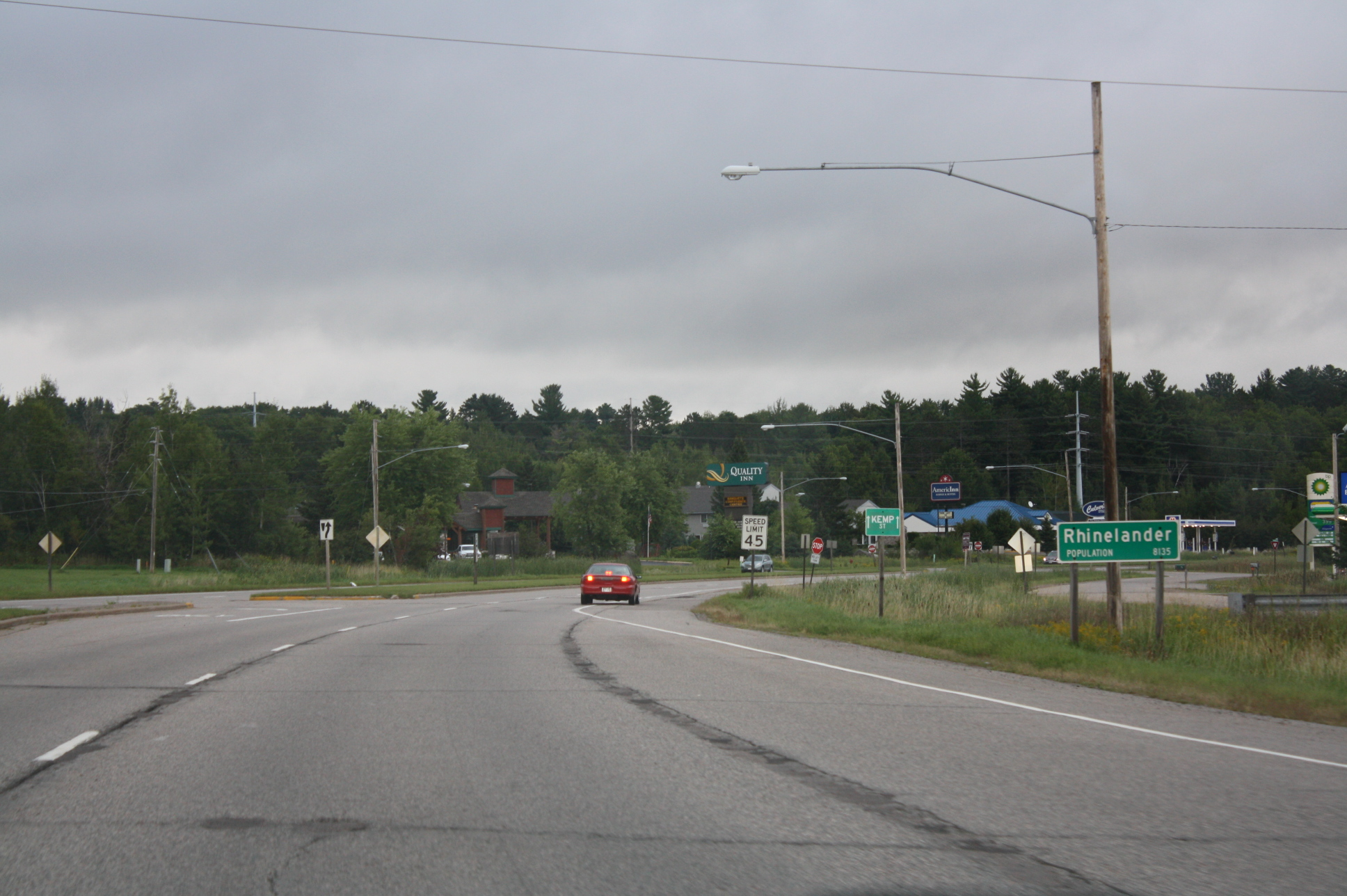
Looking east at the sign for Rhinelander on US 8

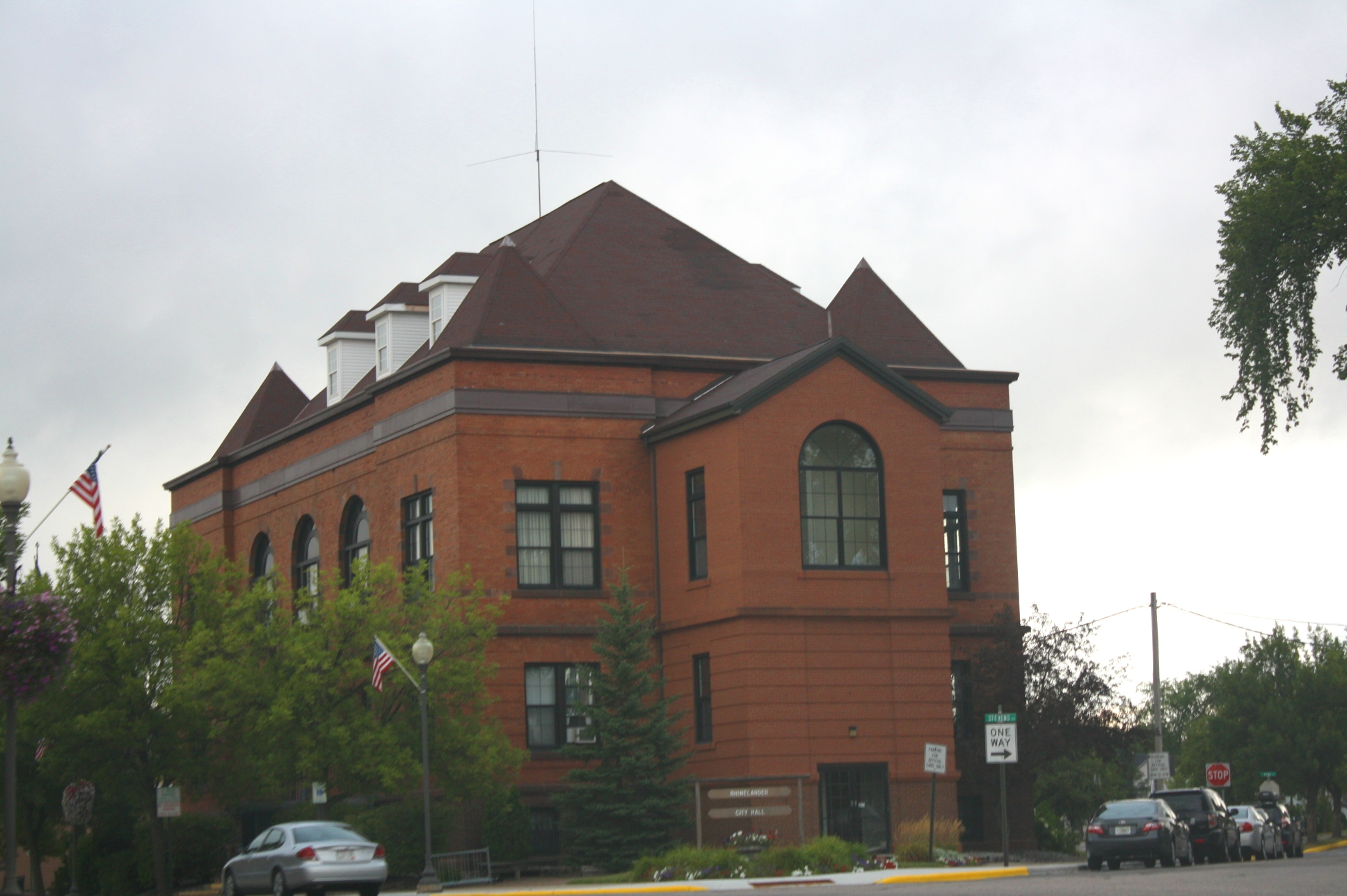
City hall

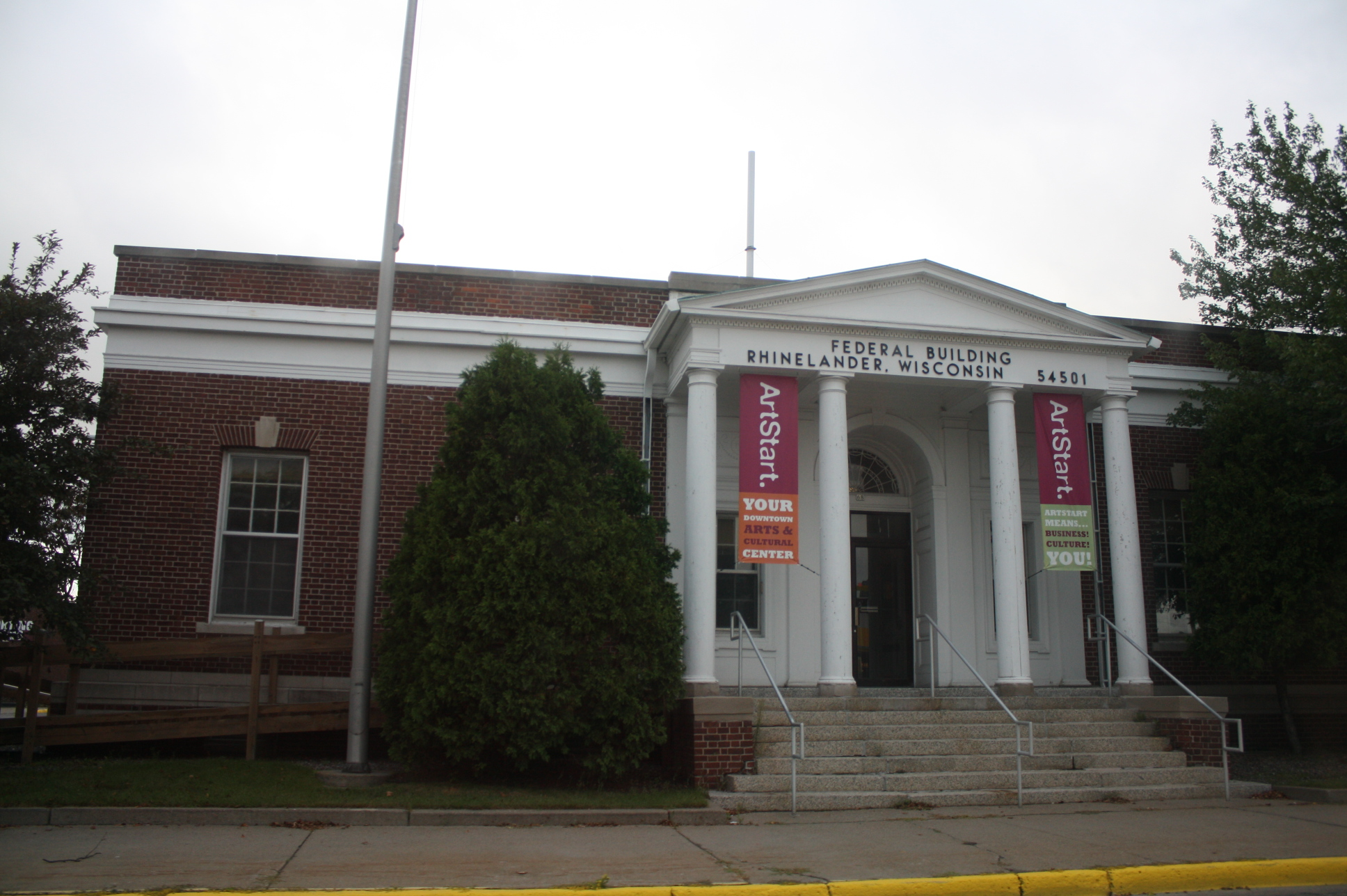
Former Federal Building, now ArtStart Gallery

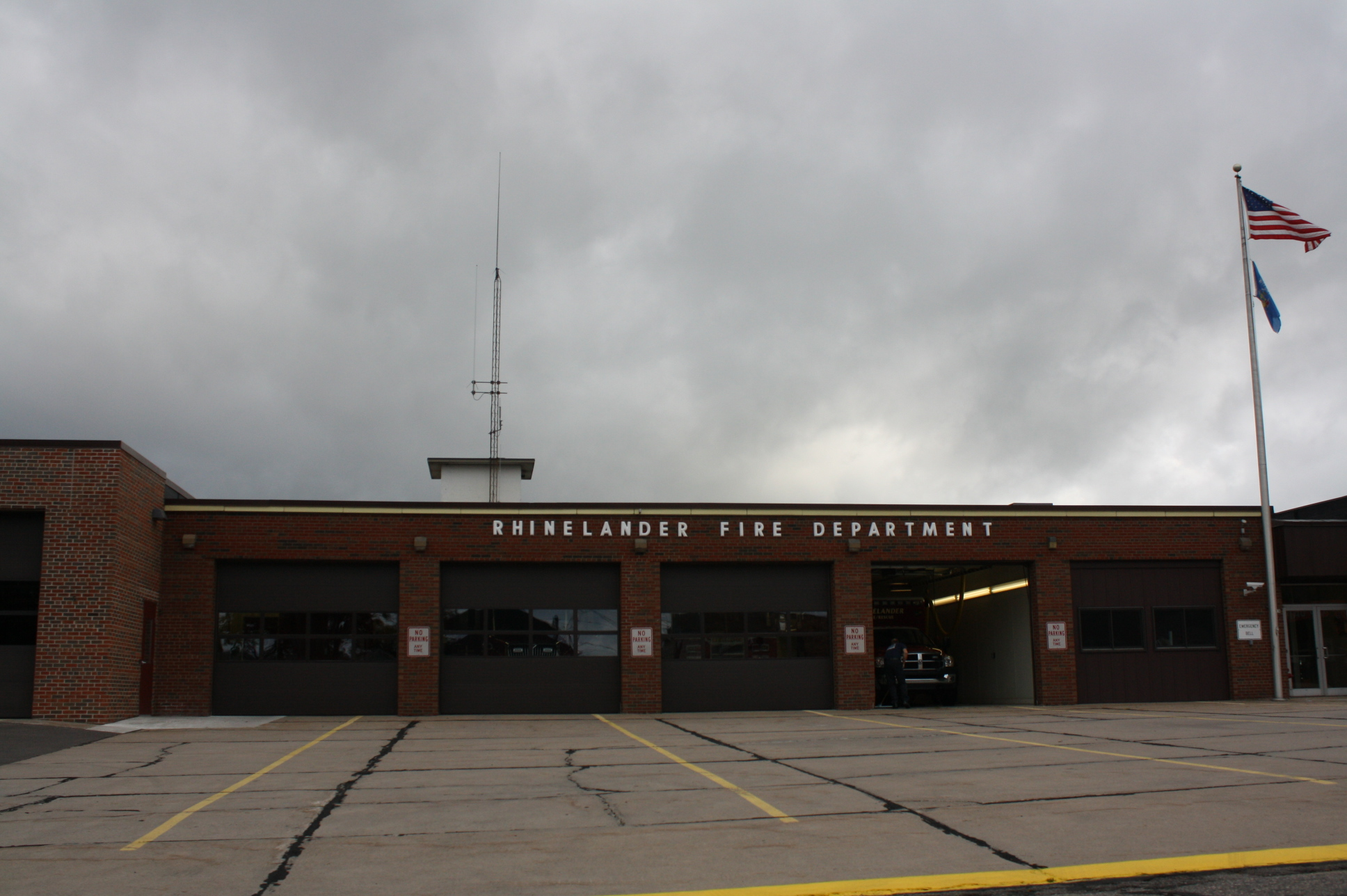
Fire department

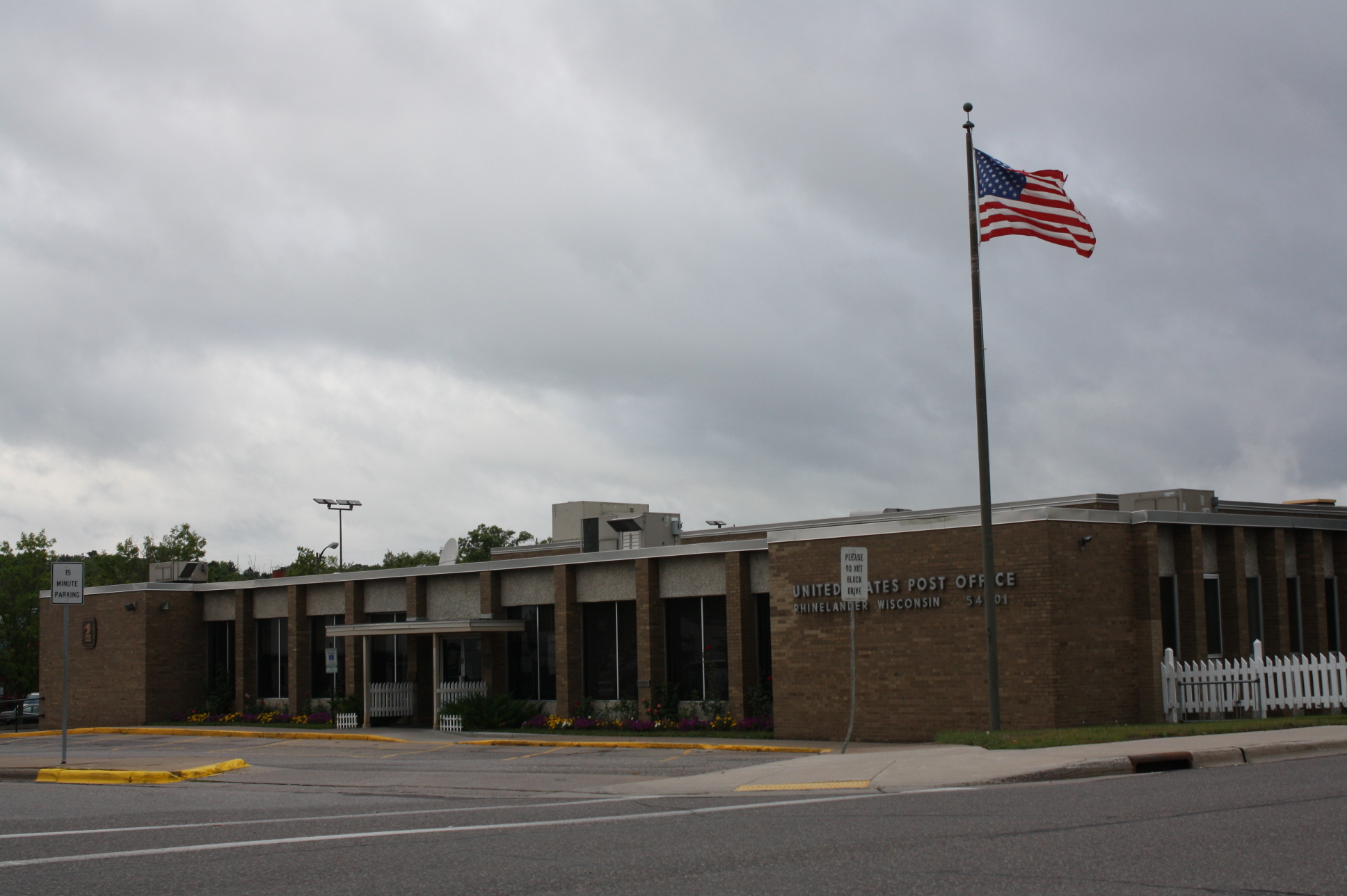
Post office

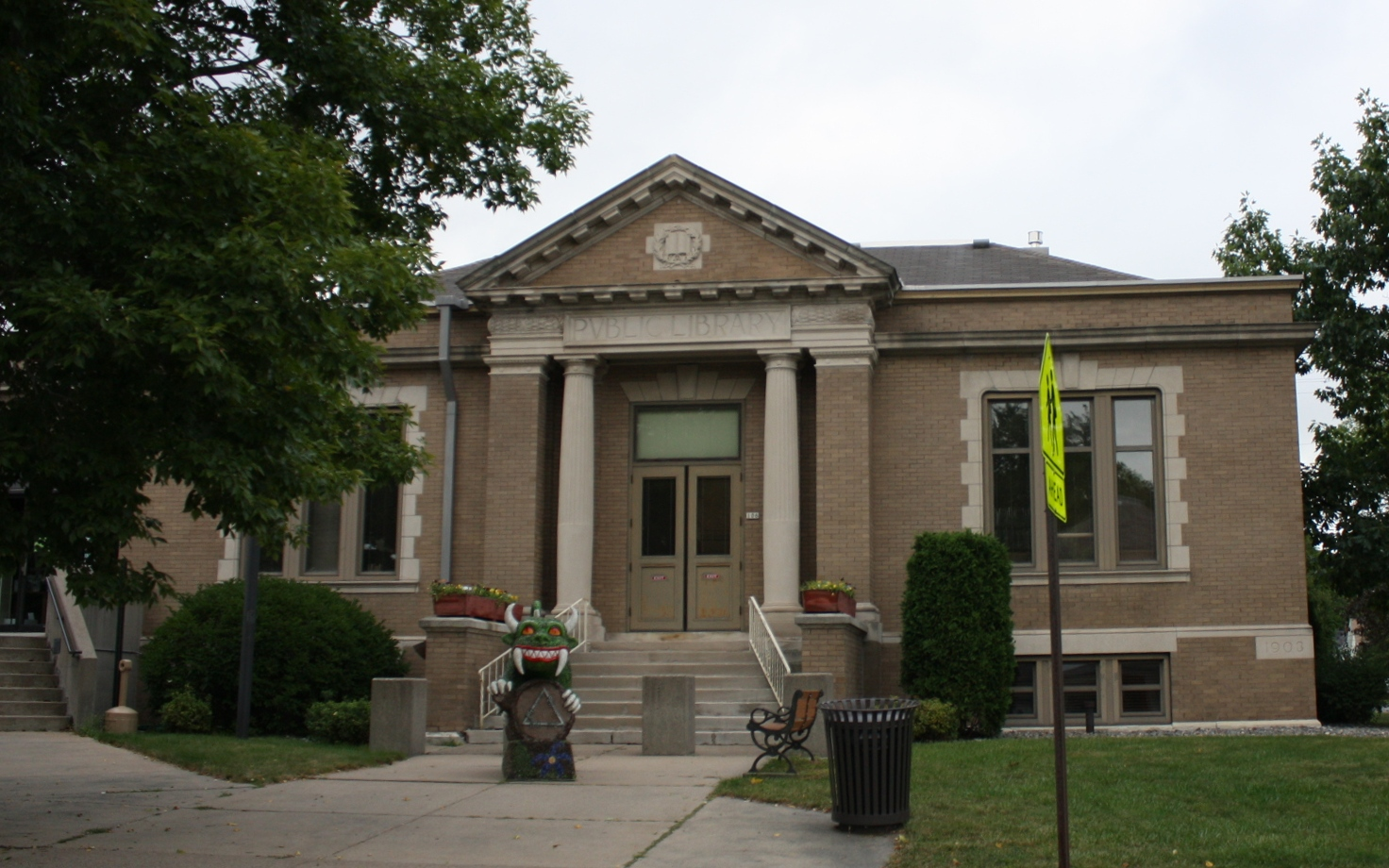
Public library

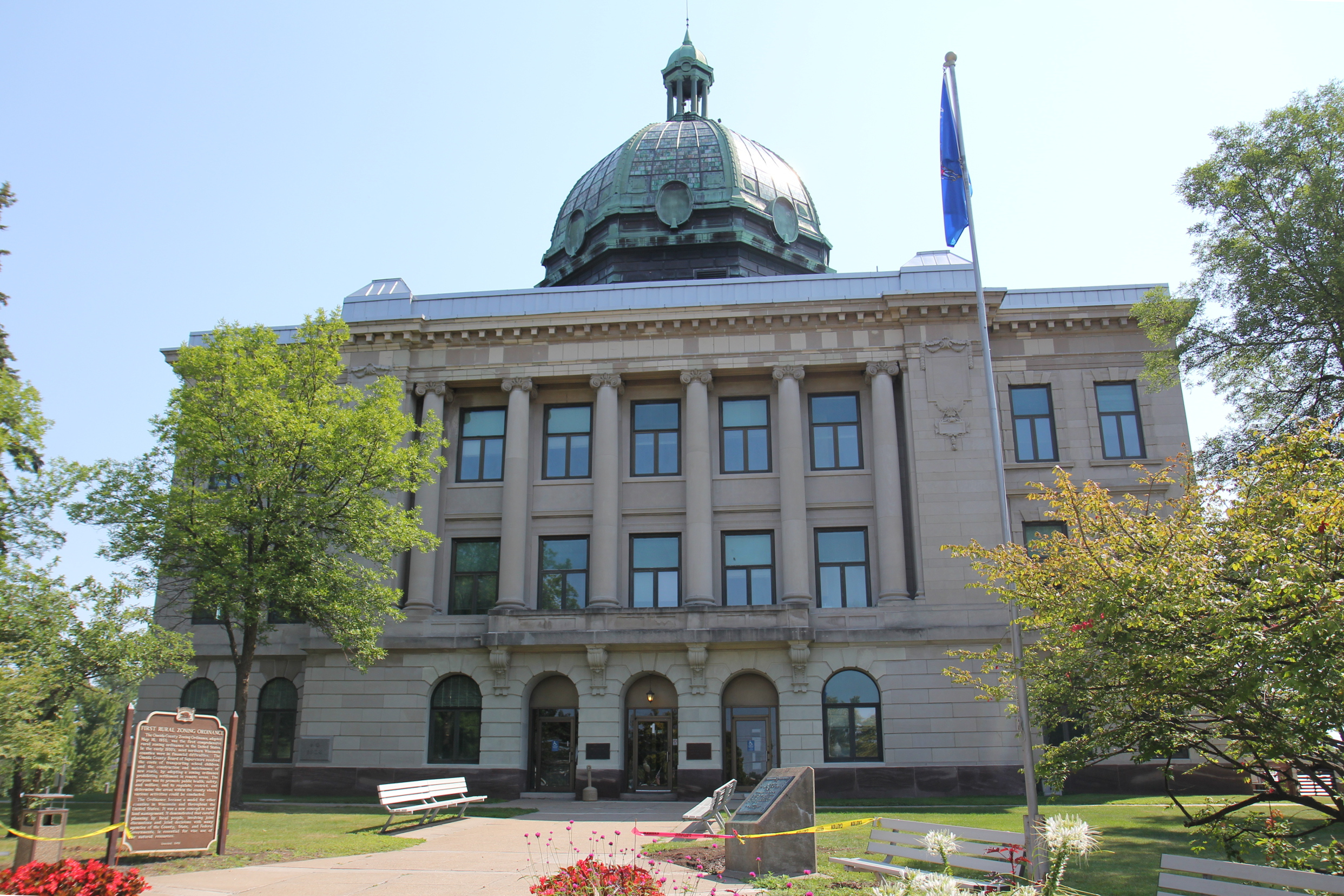
Oneida County Courthouse
