= 2009 Wisconsin elections =

- April 7, 2009

The 2009 Wisconsin Spring Election was held in the U.S. state of Wisconsin on April 7, 2009. There were contested elections for justice of the Wisconsin Supreme Court and Superintendent of Public Instruction at the top of the ticket, along with various nonpartisan local and judicial offices. The 2009 Wisconsin Spring Primary was held February 17, 2009.

Democrats' preferred candidates won both elections in the premier races in 2009. Incumbent chief justice Shirley Abrahamson won re-election with 60% of the vote, and Tony Evers was elected Superintendent with 57% of the vote.

== State elections ==
=== Executive ===
==== Superintendent of Public Instruction ====
2009 Wisconsin Superintendent of Public Instruction election
- April 7, 2009
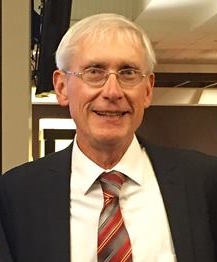

| Nominee | Tony Evers | Rose Fernandez |
| Popular vote | 439,248 | 328,511 |
| Percentage | 57.14% | 42.74% |
- County results Evers: 50–60% 60–70% Fernandez: 50–60% 60–70%
Superintendent before election
Elizabeth Burmaster
Nonpartisan
Elected Superintendent
Tony Evers
Nonpartisan

A regularly scheduled election for Superintendent of Public Instruction of Wisconsin was held at the Spring general election, April 7, 2009. Incumbent superintendent Elizabeth Burmaster did not run for a third four-year term. Deputy Superintendent Tony Evers was elected to succeed her, receiving 57% of the vote against Rose Fernandez, the president of the Wisconsin Coalition of Virtual School Families.

Evers and Fernandez emerged from a primary field which included Beloit schools superintendent Lowell Holtz, Concordia University Wisconsin professor Van Mobley, and National Louis University professor Todd Price.

Primary county results Evers: 20–30%; 30–40%; 40–50%; 50–60%; 60–70%; Fernandez: 20–30%; 30–40%; 40–50%; 50–60%

2009 Wisconsin Superintendent of Public Instruction election
| Party | Candidate | Votes | % | ±% |
|---|---|---|---|---|
Nonpartisan Primary, February 17, 2009
| Nonpartisan | Tony Evers | 89,883 | 34.99% | |
| Nonpartisan | Rose Fernandez | 79,757 | 31.04% | |
| Nonpartisan | Van Mobley | 34,940 | 13.60% | |
| Nonpartisan | Todd Price | 28,927 | 11.26% | |
| Nonpartisan | Lowell Holtz | 22,373 | 8.71% | |
| | Scattering | 1,431 | 0.18% | +0.06pp |
| Total votes | | 256,909 | 100.0% | +7.89% |
General Election, April 7, 2009
| Nonpartisan | Tony Evers | 439,248 | 57.14% | |
| Nonpartisan | Rose Fernandez | 328,511 | 42.74% | |
| | Scattering | 905 | 0.12% | +0.02pp |
| Plurality | | 110,737 | 14.41% | -10.00pp |
| Total votes | | 768,664 | 100.0% | +6.22% |

=== Legislative ===
There were no special legislative elections in 2009.

=== Judicial ===
==== Wisconsin Supreme Court ====
2009 Wisconsin Supreme Court election
- April 7, 2009
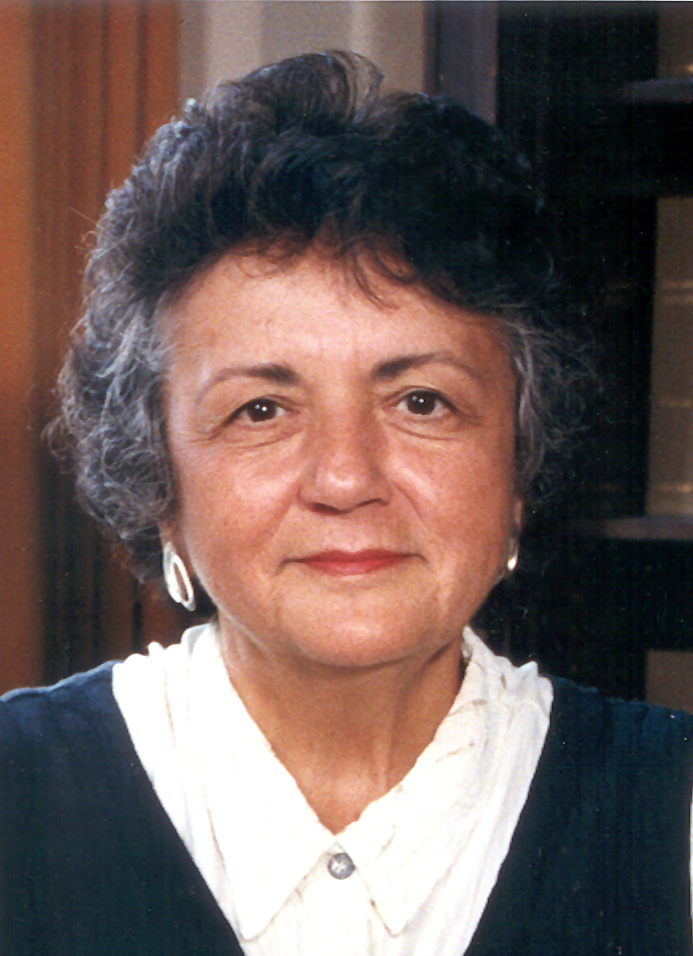

| Candidate | Shirley Abrahamson | Randy Koschnick |
| Popular vote | 473,712 | 319,706 |
| Percentage | 59.67% | 40.27% |
- County results Abrahamson: 50–60% 60–70% 70–90% Koschnick: 50–60%
Justice before election
Shirley Abrahamson
Elected Justice
Shirley Abrahamson

A regularly scheduled Wisconsin Supreme Court election was held at the Spring general election, April 7, 2009. Incumbent chief justice Shirley Abrahamson, first appointed by Governor Patrick Lucey in 1976, won her fourth ten-year term—the most Wisconsin Supreme Court elections won by any person. She defeated Jefferson County circuit judge Randy R. Koschnick, taking 59.67% of the general election vote.

Wisconsin Supreme Court Election, 2009
| Party | Candidate | Votes | % | ±% |
|---|---|---|---|---|
General Election, April 7, 2009
| Nonpartisan | Shirley S. Abrahamson (incumbent) | 473,712 | 59.67% | −3.74pp |
| Nonpartisan | Randy R. Koschnick | 319,706 | 40.27% | |
| | Scattering | 446 | 0.06% | |
| Plurality | | 154,006 | 19.40% | -7.57pp |
| Total votes | | 793,864 | 100.0% | +4.60% |

==== Wisconsin Court of Appeals ====
Two seats on the Wisconsin Court of Appeals were up for election at the Spring general election, April 7, 2009. Neither were contested.

- In District I, incumbent judge Kitty Brennan, appointed by Jim Doyle in 2008, won her first six-year term.
- In District III, incumbent judge Michael W. Hoover, first elected in 1997, won his third six-year term.

==== Wisconsin circuit courts ====
Sixty four of the state's 249 circuit court seats were on the ballot for the Spring general election, April 7, 2009. Of those seats, two were newly created. Sixteen seats were contested, four incumbent judges faced a challenger, one was defeated.

== Local elections ==
=== Dane County ===
==== Dane County executive ====
A regularly scheduled county executive election was held in Dane County, Wisconsin, concurrent with the Spring general election, April 7, 2009. The incumbent Kathleen Falk, first elected in 1997, won her fourth four-year term with 60% of the vote, defeating former Madison Metropolitan School District board member Nancy Mistele.

=== La Crosse County ===
==== La Cross mayor ====
A regularly scheduled mayoral election was held in La Crosse, Wisconsin, at the Spring general election, April 7, 2009. The incumbent Mark Johnsrud, first elected in 2005, sought a second four-year term but did not advance from the nonpartisan primary, coming in fifth place. In the general election, 24-year-old first time candidate Matt Harter defeated city councilmember Dorothy Lenard, becoming the youngest mayor in La Crosse history and one of the youngest mayors in the country. In addition to the incumbent mayor, four other candidates ran in the nonpartisan primary: city councilmembers Jim Bloedorn and Andrea Richmond, city public works employee Gary Padesky, and realtor Mick Lesky.

=== Manitowoc County ===
==== Manitowoc mayor ====
A regularly scheduled mayoral election was held in Manitowoc, Wisconsin, at the Spring general election, April 7, 2009. The incumbent Kevin Crawford, first elected in 1989, did not run for a sixth four-year term. In the general election, 22-year-old city councilmember Justin Nickels defeated city councilmember Dave Soeldner by a margin of just 15 votes (17 votes after recount), becoming one of the youngest mayors in the country. Three other candidates were eliminated in the nonpartisan primary: Manitowoc County clerk Jamie Aulik, city councilmember and Manitowoc County Board chair Jim Brey, and businessman Bob Knox.

=== Racine County ===
==== Racine mayor ====
There was a special mayoral election in Racine, Wisconsin, held on May 5, 2009, due to the arrest and subsequent resignation of the former mayor, Gary Becker. Real estate businessman John Dickert won the special election with 55% of the vote, defeating state representative Robert L. Turner. A special primary was held concurrent with the Spring general election, April 7, 2009, in which Turner and Dickert emerged from a field of 11 candidates, which also included former state senator Kimberly Plache, and city councilmembers Greg Helding, Pete Karas, Q. A. Shakoor II, and Jim Spangenberg.

=== Sheboygan County ===
==== Sheboygan mayor ====
A regularly scheduled mayoral election was held in Sheboygan, Wisconsin, at the Spring general election, April 7, 2009. The incumbent Juan Perez, first elected in 2005, sought a second four-year term but did not advance from the nonpartisan primary. In the general election, city councilmember Bob Ryan defeated state representative Terry Van Akkeren.

=== Winnebago County ===
==== Oshkosh mayor ====
A regularly scheduled mayoral election was held in Oshkosh, Wisconsin, at the Spring general election, April 7, 2009. City councilmember Paul Esslinger was elected mayor for a two-year term, defeating the incumbent mayor Frank Tower in a rematch of the 2007 election.
