= Senator Moran (disambiguation) =

Jerry Moran (born 1954) is a U.S. Senator from Kansas since 2011. Senator Moran may also refer to:

- Bernard N. Moran (1869–1940), Wisconsin State Senate
- James G. Moran (1870–1941), Massachusetts Senate
- Philip Moran (born 1961), Mississippi State Senate
