= Anderson W. Brown =

Anderson Wesley Brown (November 27, 1849 – April 25, 1923) was a Wisconsin timberman. He was born in New York to Edward Dexter Brown and Helen Margaret Anderson.

He founded the settlement that became the city of Rhinelander, Wisconsin, served as the president of the Brown Brothers Lumber Company, and was the first president of the Rhinelander Paper Company. Brown also served as chairman of the town of Pelican, and chair of the Oneida County Board of Supervisors.

Anderson Brown died April 25, 1923, in Rhinelander, Wisconsin.
