= Pioneer Park Historical Complex =

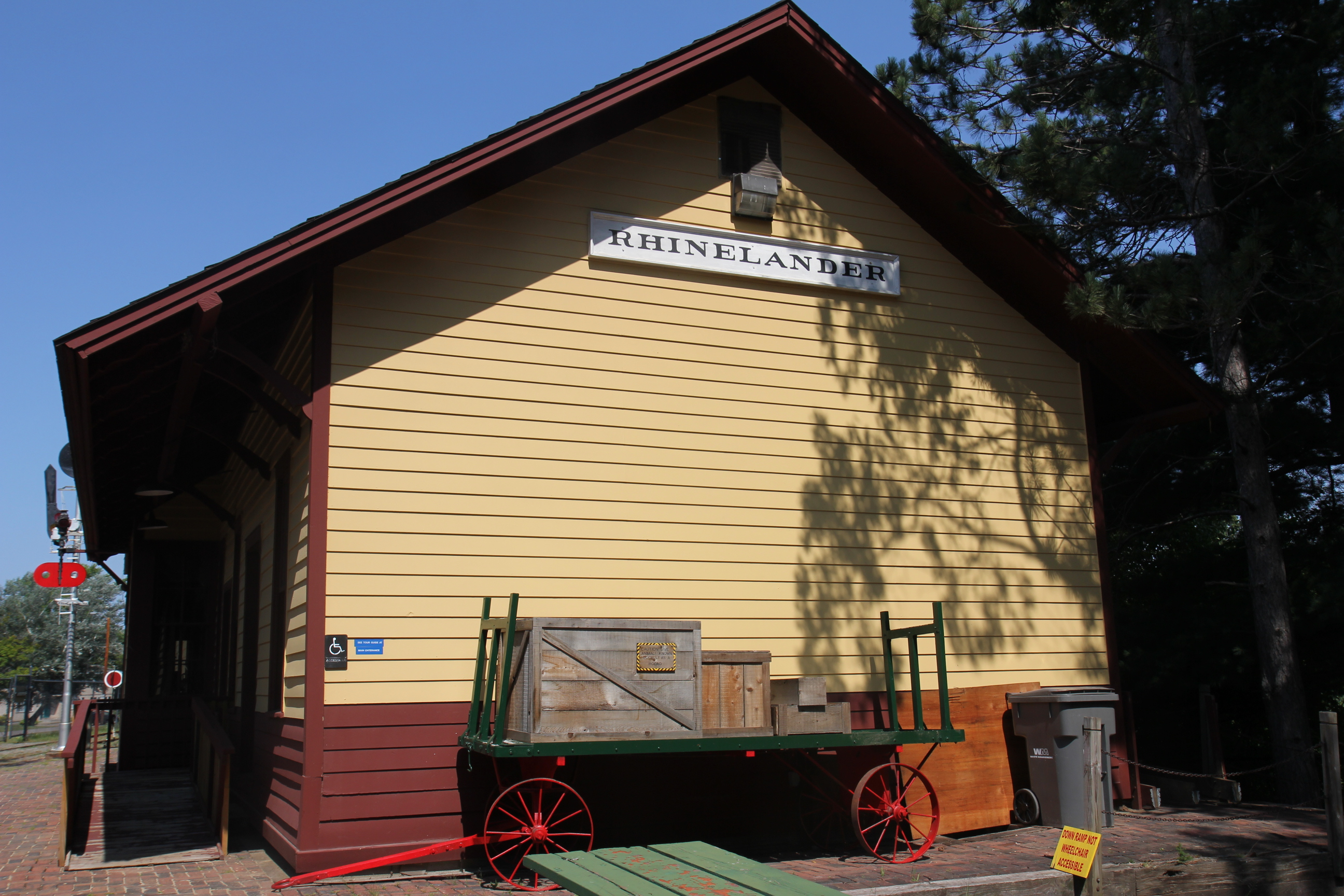
- Train station at Pioneer Park

- Location within Wisconsin Location within the United States
- Location: Oneida, Wisconsin, United States
- Coordinates: 45°40′00″N 89°20′00″W
- Established: 1932
- Governing body: City of Rhinelander
- Website: Pioneer PArk Historical Complex

Pioneer Park Historical Complex, also called Rhinelander Logging Museum, Rhinelander Schoolhouse Museum is a combination open-air museum of historical structures in Rhinelander, Wisconsin, United States. It is listed as a city park, managed by a non-profit organizations. The structures include log cabins from the fur trade era, buildings from and stores and public buildings from the late nineteenth century.

The museum houses displays related to the Hodag, a fictional animal photographed and distributed in 1896 by Eugune Sheppard. The character has become the mascot associated with Rhinelander.

== Onsite museums ==
- Wisconsin Civilian Conservation Corps Museum
  - A replica camp building of the type used by the Civilian Conservation Corps in the 1930s
- Rhinelander Logging Museum
- Rhinelander Schoolhouse Museum
- Northwoods Railroad Museum
  - Soo Line Depot
  - Baldwin 5 Spot train
- Duke’s Antique Outboard Motor and Boat Museum
- Red's Antique Sawmill & Chainsaw Museum
- Antique Fire Truck Display
- Hodag History Display
