= Northwoods Community Secondary School =

Coordinates: 45°38′54″N 89°24′00″W

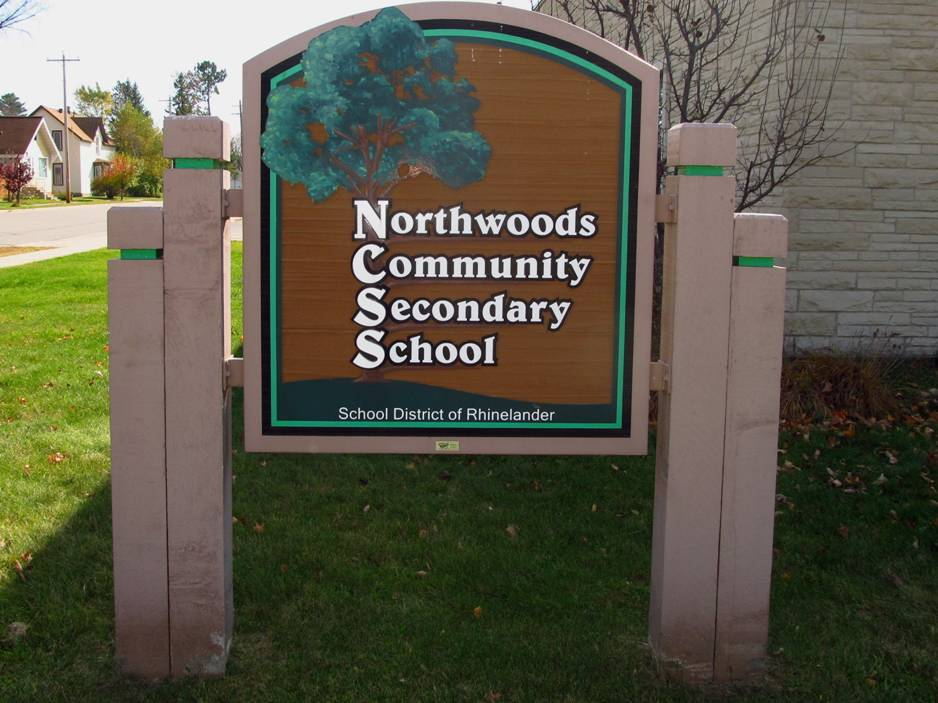

Location
- 665 Coolidge Avenue; Rhinelander, Oneida, Wisconsin 54501; United States

Information
- School type: Public, Charter
- Motto: "We're Building A Better World One Student At a Time"
- Opened: 2003
- Founder: James Blackstone
- Closed: 2017
- School district: School District of Rhinelander
- Superintendent: Kelly Jacobi
- Administrator: Wil Losch
- Grades: 6-12
- Hours in school day: 7
- Mascot: Hodag
- Rival: Antigo Red Robins
- Website: http://www.rhinelander.k12.wi.us/ncss/index.cfm

Northwoods Community Secondary School (NCSS) was an American charter school in Rhinelander, Wisconsin. Founded in 2003, the school offered a project-based curriculum.

In 2011 the Rhinelander Environmental Stewardship Academy was moved to NCSS due to a significant decrease in enrollment and the resignation of the head teacher.

Despite the passing of a 2010 referendum to keep NCSS at its location, it was decided in 2012 that the school would be moved to the Rhinelander High School.

The school closed at the end of the 2017 school year.

== Curriculum ==
Northwoods Community Secondary School offered public enrollment to approximately 90 students between 6th and 12th grade. The curriculum was independent project-based learning, as an alternative to lecture-based instruction. Students were required to develop projects in order to meet the academic requirements of the Wisconsin Department of Public Instruction. The students worked at their own pace to complete their work. Math and language arts seminars were held twice weekly. Students received credits based on performance rather than grades. Students were required to earn seven credits per year (700 hours of work, plus 25 hours of community service and 50 hours of physical education).

== Community service ==
Each NCSS Student was required to perform 25 hours of community service per school year. Community service projects included:

- Grace Lodge: “Adopt a Grand Parent”
- Operation Clean Up, or "OCU", where students raked and snow shoveled for the neighboring houses
- Working at the Rhinelander Area Food Pantry
- Working at St. Joe's Thrift Shop
- Mural painting
- Senior Center: Helping the elderly
- Contributing to the Rhinelander animal shelter
- Wisconsin Department of Natural Resources: Cleaning the river front
- City Hall: Archive organizing
- Rhinelander Historical House Tours during the Courthouse Centennial Celebration (2008)
- Community garden
- Veterans Day program
- Senior (citizen) Prom with the Kids In Need Foundation
- Tree Haven: “A Tree for Tomorrow”

== Gallery ==
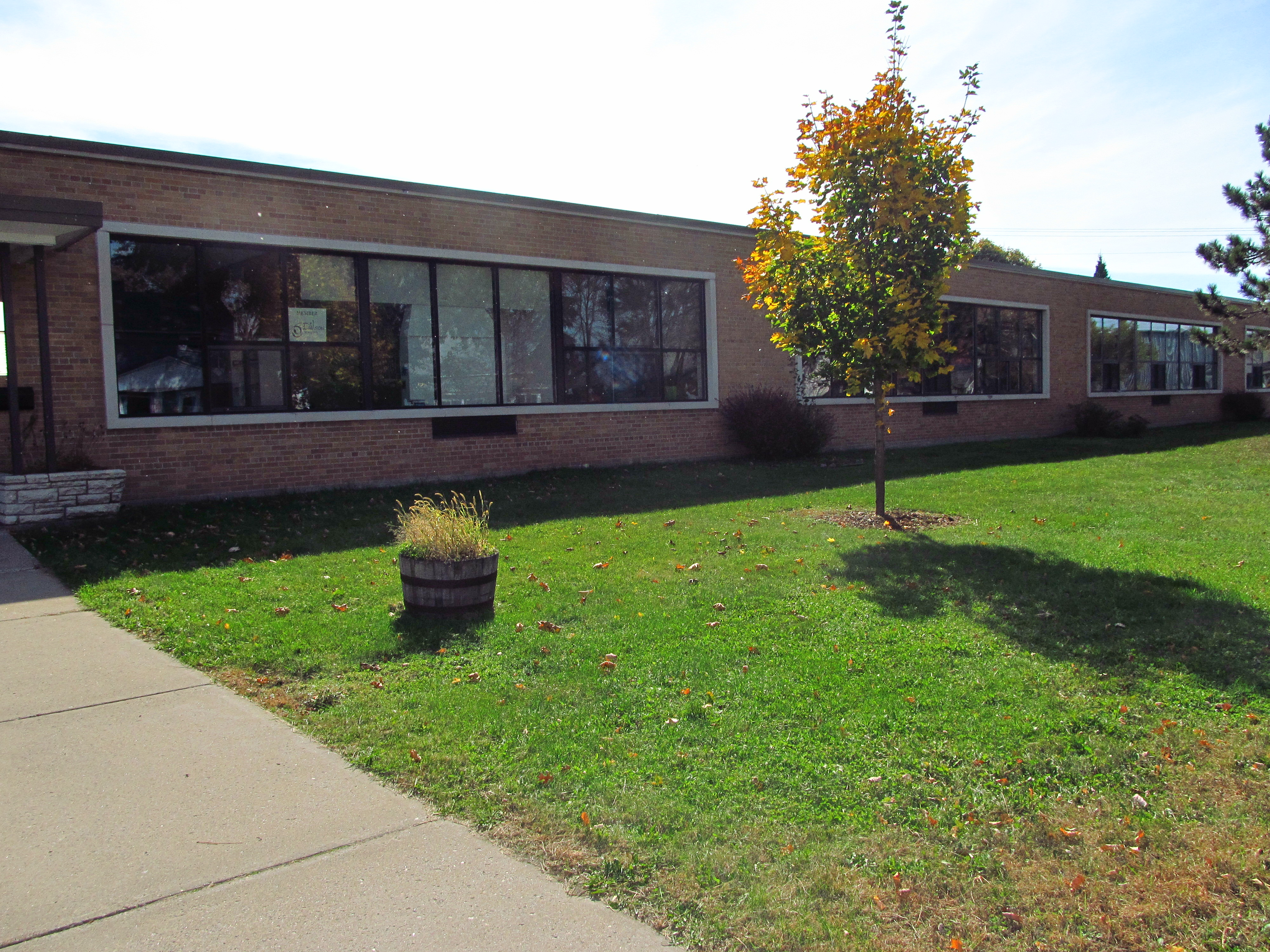
North Side of former location

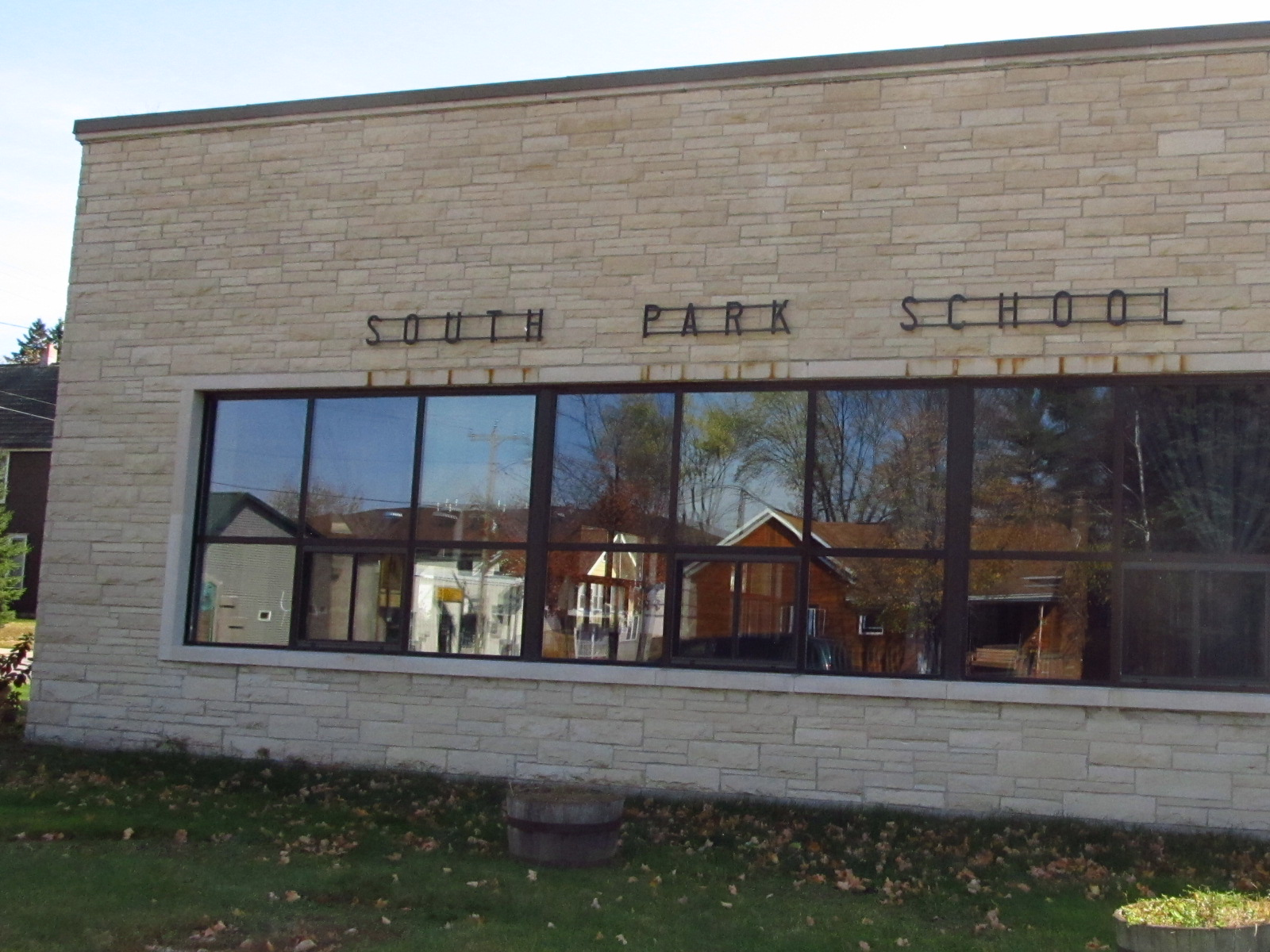
Gymnasium of former location

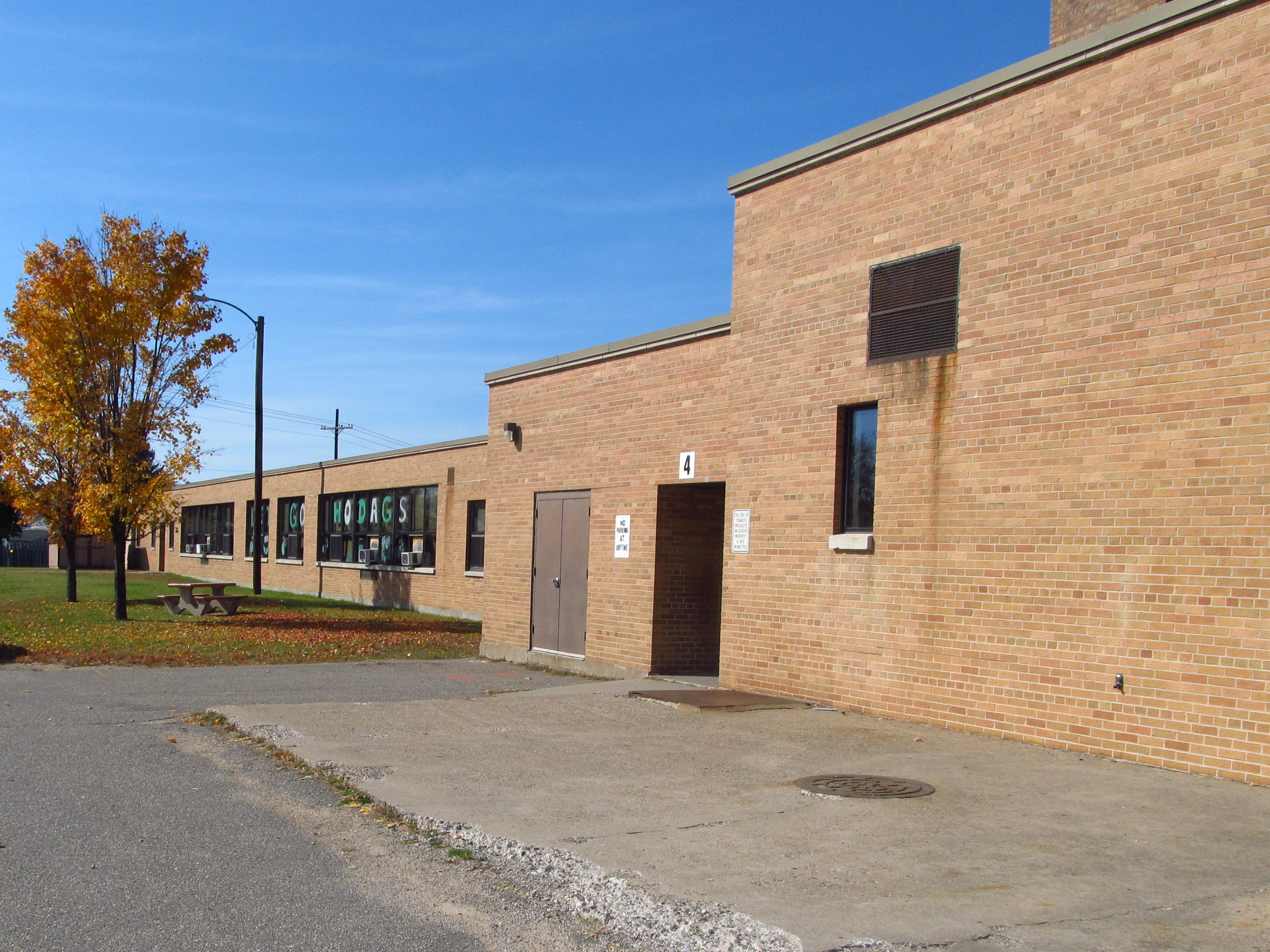
South side of former location
