= School District of Rhinelander =

School district in Wisconsin, United States

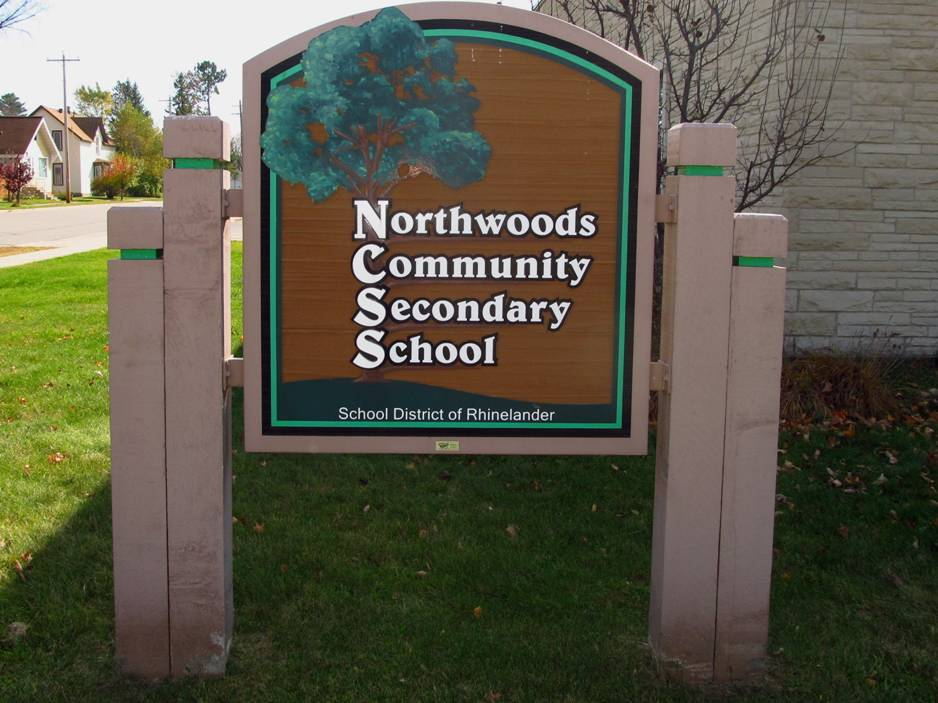
Sign of Northwoods Community Secondary School which is no longer outside the Rhinelander High School. NCSS was confirmed to be closed at the end of the 2016–17 school year.

The School District of Rhinelander (SDR) is located in Rhinelander, Wisconsin. Approximately 2,900 students are enrolled. In 2005 a referendum to keep three local schools open failed, combining fourth and fifth grade students into one intermediate school and all of the kindergarten-third grade students into two schools. In 2008 another referendum failed resulting in budget cuts to the High School's pool and field house. Again in 2010 the district ran a referendum, this time passing, allowing the secondary schools to remain in separate buildings. In late 2010 the school district was given a grant, resulting in 13.7 million dollars of heavy renovation throughout the district.

== Schools ==
=== Central Intermediate School ===
Central Intermediate School is for fourth and fifth grade students. The staff consists of thirty-seven teachers and paraprofessionals. The school's principal is Paul Johnson. Central School was originally a Kindergarten through fifth grade classes, but in 2005 after a referendum to keep three different elementary schools open failed. The district decided that all fourth and fifth grade students throughout the district would attend the school because of its large size.

=== Elementary schools ===
The district has two public pre kindergarten through third grade schools and one kindergarten through fifth charter school. At Crescent School, sixty staff are employed. The principal is Teresa Maney. At Pelican School, forty-six staff are employed, with Martha Knudtson being the principal. In 2011 the school underwent major renovation, like the high school. Northwoods Community Elementary School (NCES), also known as Casian-Woodboro Elementary School, is a project based charter school. Twenty- three staff are employed. The principal of both of the charter schools is Wil Losch.

=== Northwoods Community Secondary School ===
Northwoods Community Secondary School was founded in 2003 by Jim Blackstone. The school is a project based charter school. Students are independent on choosing what they wish to learn for some class periods. The students, however, do in fact have seminars from the other advisers in the school, such as math, language arts, and social studies. The school permits students to participate in extra curricular activities that the middle and high school offer. The school has field days on the first and last days of school for the students to build relationships with the advisers and classmates. As of the 2013-2014 year, eight staff are employed at NCSS The principal of both of the charter schools is Wil Losch. As of the 2016-17 year, NCSS is closed for good. .

=== Rhinelander High School ===
Rhinelander High School, abbreviated as RHS, is an American High School. Each year, the school puts together a lip dub, to show school spirit. The school has seventy-nine staff employed, with principal, David Ditzler. The school underwent very heavy renovation in early 2011 after receiving a large donation. The students must have twenty-three total credits at the end of their senior year. Most classes are worth .5 credits per semester, while some are higher.

=== James Williams Middle School ===
James Williams Middle School, also known as James Williams Junior High, was erected in 1974. The school has a student handbook, in which the students are expected to follow, that contains the school rules and activities. The school has an 'A Day/B Day' schedule, where a student's classes for the semester are attended between two days. Sixth grade students are required to take math, science, social studies, basic music, basic art, health, and guidance classes. Students are given the choice to replace their basic music and art classes with band, chorus, and/or high interest art. Seventh grade students are required to take math, science, U.S. History, Industrial Tech, Family and Computer Sciences, and computers. Eighth grade students are not required to take any type of music art classes, but the option is made to them. The students are permitted to do after school activities such as track and field, after school programs, and sports. Sixty staff are employed.

=== Rhinelander Environmental Stewardship Academy ===
The Rhinelander Environmental Stewardship Academy (often abbreviated as RESA) was founded by Kirby Kohler, a former adviser at Northwoods Community Secondary School. RESA is an environmental school, focusing on the outdoors. The students also learn math through a program on their computers, as well as language arts. The school has many field days, in which they would go "wild ricing", watching prairie chickens, or tracking bear and bobcats. In 2011, the school was moved from the junior high to the charter school and in 2012 to Rhinelander High School.

=== Cedric A. Vig Outdoor Classroom ===
Often abbreviated as CAVOC, the Cedric A. Vig Outdoor Classroom is named for the late Cedric Vig. CAVOC was founded in the late 1970s, to educate students about the outdoors. CAVOC also provides wetland trails, ski trails, and rope courses.
