= Robert Vito =

American journalist

Robert Vito was an American television correspondent and bureau chief for CNN, his role as bureau chief covered Los Angeles, Miami, Rome and Detroit.

== Career ==
In 1968, he became a general assignment reporter at WAEO-TV, in Rhinelander, Wisconsin. On November 17, 1968, an airplane with three passengers crashed into the transmission tower, killing all three passengers. The station was knocked off the air for nearly a year. Vito was hired by Milwaukee-based WISN-TV in 1969, working as an investigative reporter under the name "Bob Viverito." He left WISN in 1973 to take a job with WWJ-TV to do "investigative reporting and some anchoring." In 1975, Vito interviewed former Teamster President Jimmy Hoffa; it would be Hoffa's last interview, as he disappeared two weeks later. He left WWJ-TV and joined CNN, becoming the first Detroit bureau chief in 1982. He later became CNN's bureau chief expanding in Rome, Los Angeles, and finally, Miami.

In 1999, Vito retired from CNN and became a jury consultant for a Florida legal consulting firm.

== Achievements ==
Over the years, he has received numerous awards, including numerous Emmys and two Cable ACE awards.

== Personal life ==
Vito was widowed in 2012, after his wife, Nancy, died from cancer. He died from cancer a year later on 13 November 2013. He is survived by his son and grandson.
