= Elizabeth Burmaster =

American educator (born 1954)

President of Frederick Community College
- In office 2014–2021

President of Nicolet Area Technical College
- In office 2009–2014

25th Superintendent of Public Instruction of Wisconsin
- In office July 2, 2001 – July 6, 2009
- Governor: Scott McCallum; Jim Doyle
- Preceded by: John T. Benson
- Succeeded by: Tony Evers

Personal details
- Born: July 26, 1954 (age 71) Baltimore, Maryland, U.S.
- Spouse: John Burmaster (m. 1980)
- Children: 3
- Education: University of Wisconsin–Madison (BA, MA)

Elizabeth Burmaster (born July 26, 1954) is an American educator who was the elected State Superintendent of Public Instruction in Wisconsin from 2001 to 2009. After 45 years working in public education, Burmaster retired in July 2021.

== Life and career ==
Burmaster received her bachelor's and master's degrees from the University of Wisconsin–Madison. She has honorary doctorates from Beloit College and Edgewood College. Her 45-year career in public education includes teaching positions in the Madison, WI Metropolitan School District at Sennett Middle School, Longfellow Elementary, and Madison East High School.

She was the principal of Hawthorne Elementary and Madison West High School. She was elected for two terms as the State Superintendent of Public Instruction in WI, first by 60% and then by 62%. She served on the University of WI System Board of Regents from 2001 to 2009.

Burmaster served for five years as president of Nicolet College in Wisconsin and for seven years as president of Frederick Community College in Maryland. In 2021 the Board of Trustees of Frederick Community College awarded her President Emeritus status. The Frederick County Executive declared June 13, 2021, Elizabeth "Libby" Burmaster Day in honor of her leadership in Frederick County, Maryland.

In 2018 the Frederick Community College faculty had a vote of no-confidence in Burmaster and the Board of Trustees extended her contract. Faculty also alleged that their concerns about Burmaster had not been addressed and that her problematic behavior had escalated; Board members responded by expressing support for Burmaster. The no confidence vote by the Faculty Association was later affirmed by the other two campus affinity groups, for administrators and support personnel. Faculty members alleged Burmaster created a hostile working environment at the college. Employees at the college described a culture of fear on campus and bullying behavior from Burmaster, and retired and former employees shared letters with the Board about their concerns regarding Burmaster's behavior. Faculty wrote a letter to Burmaster, asking for an apology and changes, such as the hiring of an ombudsperson, to improve campus morale. Faculty members also protested Burmaster's alleged bullying and the lack of action from the Board. The Frederick News-Post published an article called "A pattern of abuse: Frederick Community College president has history of harassment complaints" that describes situations such as a six-month investigation into Burmaster when she was a principal in Wisconsin and concerns about her leadership and alleged bullying behavior at Nicolet College. An article published the same day reported that the chair of the Board said she did not know about Burmaster's alleged history of problematic behavior, despite having conducted a comprehensive presidential search and applicant screening, complete with a visit to Nicolet College. The Board of Trustees responded to the investigative report by expressing support for Burmaster. A Maryland state delegate asked the Board to arrange for independent investigations of the complaints about Burmaster. The Frederick News-Post published two editorials indicating that the Board had made mistakes and needed to take action related to the employee concerns about Burmaster. An external reviewer, recommended by the Middles States Commission on Higher Education, then visited the campus to conduct an assessment of college governance, based on a strategic priority previously set by the Board.

Elizabeth and her husband, John Burmaster, have been married since 1980. They have three adult children and seven grandsons.
