= Arthur M. Rogers =

American politician

Arthur M. Rogers (April 1, 1860 – August 11, 1939) was a member of the Wisconsin State Assembly.

== Biography ==
Rogers was born on April 1, 1860, in Fisk, Wisconsin, the son of Chester Rogers and Evelyn Ripley Rogers. He moved to Shawano County, Wisconsin, in 1879 and Rhinelander, Wisconsin, in 1885 before settling in Forest County, Wisconsin. He married Ettie Holford in 1882. He died on August 11, 1939, and was buried at Forest Home Cemetery in Rhinelander.

== Career ==
Rogers was elected to the Assembly in 1916. Other positions he held include County Surveyor of Forest County. He was a Republican.
