= Bernard N. Moran =

American politician

Bernard N. Moran (January 31, 1869 – October 8, 1940) was a member of the Wisconsin State Assembly and the Wisconsin State Senate.

== Biography ==
Moran was born to Irish immigrants on January 31, 1869 in Oshkosh, Wisconsin, both of whom died by the time he was eleven years old. After their deaths, he was raised at an orphanage in Green Bay, Wisconsin. He moved to Rhinelander, Wisconsin in 1886. On June 2, 1897, Moran married Lida G. O'Hara (1875–1955). They had one daughter. Moran died in Rhinelander on October 8, 1940.

== Career ==
Moran was elected to the Assembly in 1915 and to the Senate in 1920. Additionally, he was Chairman, Assessor, Treasurer and Clerk of Rhinelander and Chairman of the Oneida County, Wisconsin Board. He was a Republican.
