= Nicolet College =

Public two-year college in Rhinelander, Wisconsin, U.S.

Coordinates: 45°36′34″N 89°25′26″W

Nicolet Area Technical College
- Type: Public community college
- Parent institution: Wisconsin Technical College System
- President: Kate Ferrel
- Students: 2,000
- Location: Rhinelander, Wisconsin, United States
- Campus: Rural
- Colors: Tan and brown
- Website: nicoletcollege.edu

Nicolet College is a public community college with its main campus in Rhinelander, Wisconsin. It has outreach centers in Carter, Crandon, Eagle River, the Forest County Potawatomi Community, Lac du Flambeau, Minocqua, Mole Lake, and Tomahawk.

It is one of 16 colleges in the Wisconsin Technical College System. Created in 1967, the Nicolet district covers all of Oneida, Vilas and Forest counties and portions of Lincoln, Langlade and Iron counties.

== History ==
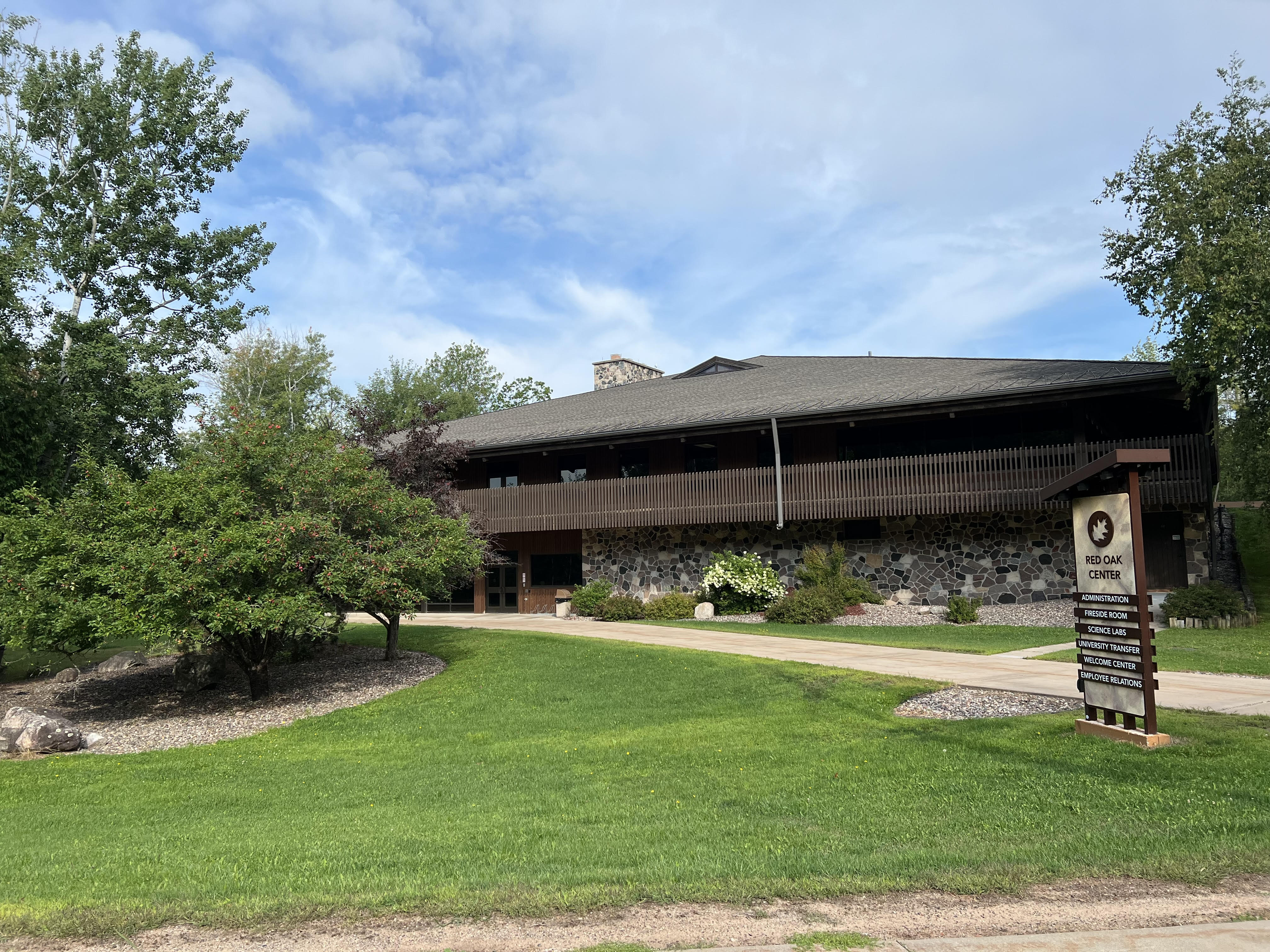
The Red Oak Center is one of the main buildings on campus, featuring the welcome center and student services

The Nicolet College District was created in 1967 with classes starting in January 1968. Shortly after the district was formed, college officials purchased 280 acres just south of Rhinelander to build the Lake Julia Campus. The first building, the Science Center, now the University Student Center, was constructed in 1969 and 1970. While that was being built, the college held its first classes in downtown Rhinelander in what is now the Rhinelander Fire Department.

== Academics ==
Nicolet offers 70 degrees, diplomas, and certificates. Classes are offered during the day, in the evening, and online. Students may be enrolled part-time or full-time. Nicolet offers international studies, transfer agreements, and university transfer liberal arts programs.

=== Northern National Arts Competition ===
For the last three decades, Nicolet College has hosted the Northern National Art Competition, a cooperative venture between Nicolet College and the Northern Arts Council. The competition draws entries on a national scale and has been characterized as "one of the premiere national art exhibits in Wisconsin." Past notable jurors have included Emily Lanctot, director and curator for the DeVos Art Museum School of Art & Design at Northern Michigan University, Scott Stulen, Director and President of the Philbrook Museum of Art in Tulsa, Oklahoma, artists Jeanine Coupe Ryding, Mark Steven Greenfield, and most recently artist and art critic F. Lennox Campello.

== Student body ==
Nicolet has an enrollment of about 2,000 students aged 18 and older. Annually more than 10,000 people attend events and courses held at Nicolet.
