= National Register of Historic Places listings in Oneida County, Wisconsin =

Location of Oneida County in Wisconsin

This is a list of the National Register of Historic Places listings in Oneida County, Wisconsin. It is intended to provide a comprehensive listing of entries in the National Register of Historic Places that are located in Oneida County, Wisconsin. The locations of National Register properties for which the latitude and longitude coordinates are included below may be seen in a map.

There are 25 properties and districts listed on the National Register in the county.

This National Park Service list is complete through NPS recent listings posted August 28, 2026.

== Current listings ==
	Name on the Register	Image	Date listed	Location	City or town	Description
1	Ella M. Boesel Boathouse		August 15, 1997 (#97000889)	9282 Country Club Rd. 45°52′02″N 89°41′15″W	Minocqua	Wet boathouse on Minocqua Lake, built in 1935 with elements of Craftsman style. Frank Boesel was a prominent Milwaukee lawyer.
2	First National Bank	First National Bank	August 14, 1973 (#73000091)	8 W. Davenport St. 45°38′17″N 89°24′41″W	Rhinelander	1911 brick bank with floral terra cotta ornamentation, designed in Prairie style by George Grant Elmslie.
3	Fishers Island	Fishers Island	November 21, 1994 (#94001329)	Address Restricted; 45°52′22″N 89°41′10″W	Minocqua	
4	Hans J. Hagge Boathouse		December 28, 2005 (#05001493)	7220 Newell Rd. 45°49′00″N 89°43′23″W	Hazelhurst	Wet boathouse on Lake Katherine, built 1938-39 in Craftsman style. Hagge was a Wausau businessman.
5	Indianapolis Outing Club		March 10, 2004 (#04000156)	7371 Wheeler Island Rd. 45°49′18″N 89°08′35″W	Three Lakes	Private club on Planting Ground Lake constructed by businessmen from Indiana and Kentucky around 1902.
6	Jollywood		March 26, 2003 (#03000166)	999 Leatzow Rd. 45°49′25″N 89°06′29″W	Three Lakes	Rustic family retreat on Big Fork Lake, designed by baseball great Cy Williams and built from 1925 to 1948.
7	Lake Tomahawk Site	Lake Tomahawk Site	January 4, 1996 (#95001496)	Address Restricted	Lake Tomahawk	Four conical burial mounds built by Woodland people.
8	Little St. Germain Creek Site	Little St. Germain Creek Site	March 25, 1993 (#93000217)	Address Restricted	Newbold	
9	George P. Mayer Boathouse		March 21, 2011 (#11000115)	7708 Braeger Rd. 45°49′53″N 89°10′11″W	Three Lakes	1920 Craftsman-style wet boathouse on Planting Ground Lake, with living quarters upstairs.
10	McCord Village	McCord Village	April 6, 2001 (and 05000102 #01000346 and 05000102)	Address Restricted	Lynne	Site of a village of off-reservation Potowatomi, Ojibwes and others, occupied from the 1890s to 1950s.
11	Mecikalski General Store, Saloon, and Boardinghouse	Mecikalski General Store, Saloon, and Boardinghouse	March 22, 1984 (#84003751)	465 Max Rd. 45°30′28″N 89°04′16″W	Jennings	Large stovewood building constructed around 1899 which served as a general store, living quarters, saloon, and boarding house for lumberjacks.
12	Marshall D. Miller Boathouse		August 1, 2008 (#08000747)	7304 Campground Rd. 45°48′45″N 89°06′51″W	Three Lakes	Two-story wet boathouse on Laurel Lake, constructed around 1920. Miller was a leader of the Chicago and Northwestern Railway.
13	Oneida County Courthouse	Oneida County Courthouse	March 20, 1981 (#81000052)	S. Oneida Ave. 45°38′15″N 89°24′26″W	Rhinelander	3-story Neoclassical building with large octagonal dome, designed by Christ H. Tegen of Manitowoc and built 1908 to 1910. Inside of two murals from Rhinelander's history and one of the mythical hodag.
14	Pelican Lake Hotel	Pelican Lake Hotel	January 14, 2013 (#12001188)	745 US 45; 45°29′48″N 89°10′09″W	Schoepke	2-story brick hotel built on Pelican Lake in 1928, after the previous Beach Hotel burned. Served as a community center for the tiny village.
15	Phillip Orth Boathouse		December 28, 2005 (#05001492)	9204 Country Club Rd. 45°52′07″N 89°40′47″W	Minocqua	Two-story wet boathouse in Craftsman style, built in 1926 on Lake Minocqua.
16	Reay Boathouse		July 21, 2004 (#04000730)	1260 Honk Hill Rd. 45°48′28″N 89°07′35″W	Three Lakes	1928 two-story wet boathouse in Craftsman style, on the Three Lakes chain. Reay was comptroller of the International Harvester Company.
17	Solon and Mathilda Sutliff House	Solon and Mathilda Sutliff House	October 7, 2009 (#09000821)	306 Dahl St. 45°38′18″N 89°24′24″W	Rhinelander	Italian Renaissance styled house built in 1923 for Sutliff, a Rhinelander businessman with interests in lumber and paper.
18	Texaco Service Station		July 24, 2023 (#100009186)	329 Front St. 45°52′17″N 89°42′32″W	Minocqua	1931 Texaco station, clad in colored brick, with round-topped doors and windows.
19	Three Lakes Rod and Gun Club	Three Lakes Rod and Gun Club	September 30, 2013 (#13000808)	1230 State Trunk Hwy. 32; 45°48′17″N 89°07′35″W	Three Lakes	Well-preserved private club founded in 1899 chiefly by sportsmen from Batavia, Illinois on an isthmus between Spirit, Medicine and Laurel Lakes.
20	Tom 2 Site	Tom 2 Site	November 21, 1994 (#94001330)	Address Restricted; 45°48′56″N 89°38′36″W	Lake Tomahawk	
21	Tomahawk Lake Camp Historic District		January 30, 1992 (#91001987)	8500 Raven Rd. 45°48′03″N 89°37′57″W	Lake Tomahawk	Tuberculosis sanatorium built in the early twentieth century for the fresh northwoods air. Some of the seventeen buildings are Tudor Revival.
22	Joseph and Augusta Trunck Boathouse		August 1, 2008 (#08000750)	1000 Leatzow Rd. 45°49′05″N 89°06′40″W	Three Lakes	Two-story gambrel-roofed wet boathouse built in 1928 on Little Fork Lake.
23	Luther and Anna Walter Boathouse		December 28, 2005 (#05001494)	9574 Country Club Rd. 45°51′57″N 89°42′16″W	Minocqua	Craftsman-style wet boathouse on Minocqua Lake, with hip roof and clapboard siding.
24	West Side School	West Side School	March 5, 2009 (#09000124)	718 W. Phillip St. 45°38′27″N 89°25′29″W	Rhinelander	Graded school built in 1928 and expanded in 1939, in Collegiate Gothic style. Kindergarten classroom has a fireplace with fairy tale illustrations on the tiles. Now converted to apartments.
25	William H. Yawkey Boathouse		December 30, 2009 (#09001198)	7090 Woodson St. 45°48′32″N 89°43′14″W	Hazelhurst	Two-story wet boathouse on Lake Katherine, built in 1917. Yawkey was a son of a lumber baron and owner of the Detroit Tigers from 1903 to 1919.

== See also ==
- List of National Historic Landmarks in Wisconsin
- National Register of Historic Places listings in Wisconsin
- Listings in neighboring counties: Forest, Langlade, Lincoln, Price, Vilas
