= Sutliff =

Sutliff may refer to:

== In people ==
- Michael Sutliff (born 1975), English cricketer
- Milton Sutliff (1806-1878), American politician
- Phebe Temperance Sutliff (1859-1955), American educator; president, Rockford College

== In places ==
- Sutliff, Iowa, unincorporated community in Cedar Township, Johnson County, Iowa, U.S.

== In other ==
- Solon and Mathilda Sutliff House, historic house in Rhinelander, Wisconsin, U.S.
- Sutliff Bridge, bridge over the Cedar River at in Johnson County, Iowa, U.S.
