= Yawkey =

Yawkey may refer to:

== Communities ==
- Yawkey, West Virginia, an unincorporated community in Lincoln County, West Virginia

== People ==
- Yawkey (surname)

== Places ==
=== Massachusetts ===
- Yawkey Athletics Center, on the campus of Boston College in Chestnut Hill, Massachusetts
- Yawkey station, the former name of Lansdowne station in Boston, Massachusetts
- Yawkey Way, the former name of a two-block section of Jersey Street in Boston, Massachusetts

=== Wisconsin ===
- Cyrus C. Yawkey House, a historic structure in Wausau, Wisconsin
- Leigh Yawkey Woodson Art Museum, in Wausau, Wisconsin
- William H. Yawkey Boathouse, a historic structure in Hazelhurst, Wisconsin
