= Harrison Stuckslager House =

Historic house in Iowa, United States

- U.S. National Register of Historic Places
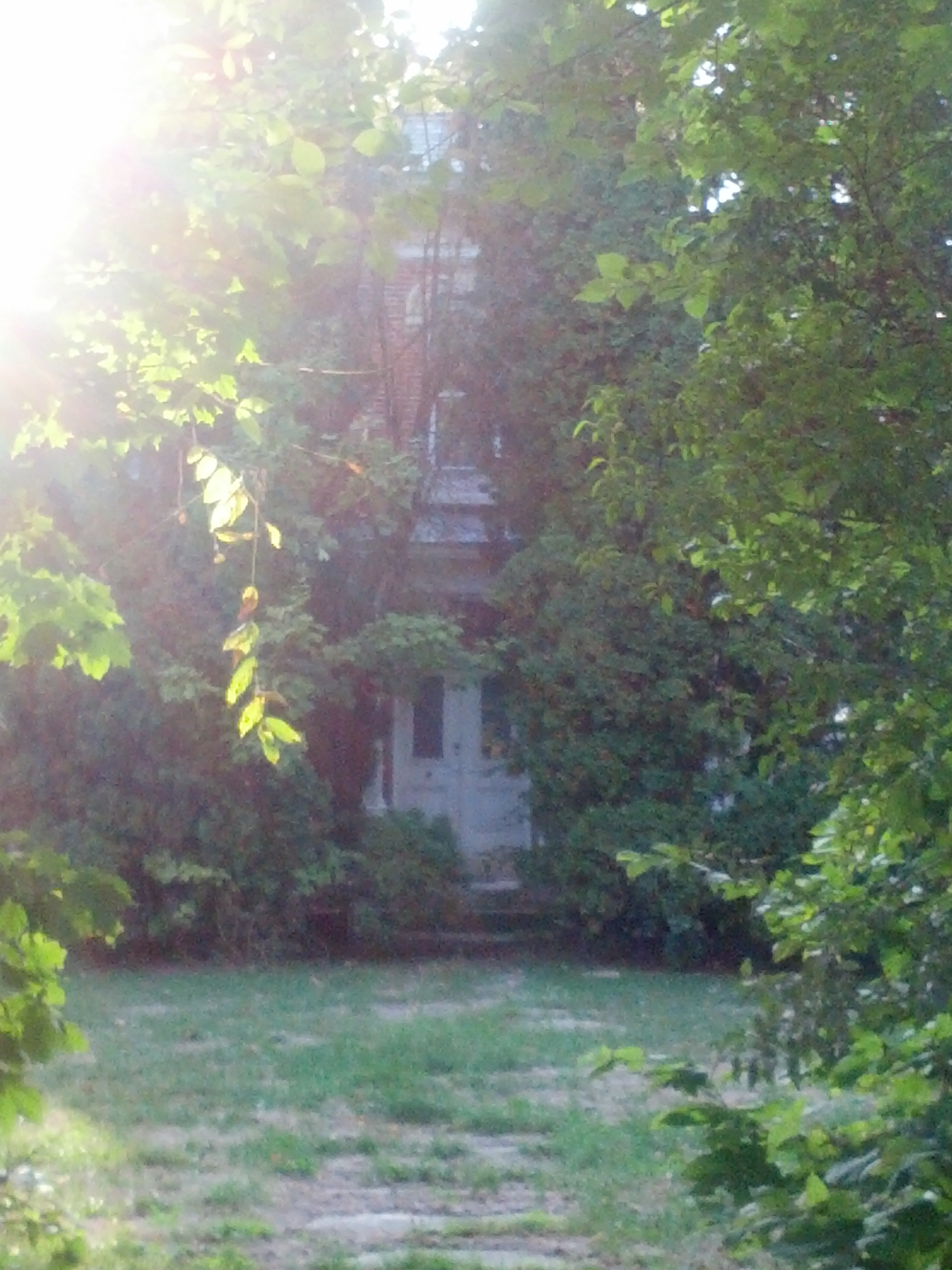

- Location within Iowa Location within the United States
- Location: 207 N. Jackson St. Lisbon, Iowa
- Coordinates: 41°55′25.5″N 91°23′04.1″W
- Area: 3.5 acres (1.4 ha)
- Built: 1876
- Architectural style: Italianate
- NRHP reference No.: 79000910
- Added to NRHP: October 1, 1979

The Harrison Stuckslager House is a historic building located in Lisbon, Iowa, United States. A Pennsylvania native, Stuckslager permanately settled in Linn County in 1866 where he became a prominent farmer and banker. He had this two-story, brick vernacular Italianate house built in 1876. It features bracketed eaves, decorative window hoods, projecting bays, and elaborate porches. The house remains on a full block north of Lisbon's central business district that includes the former carriage barn and storage shed, a small horse pasture, the remains of an orchard, and gardens. The house was listed on the National Register of Historic Places in 1979.
