= Lisbon Main Street Historic District =

Historic district in Iowa, United States

- U.S. National Register of Historic Places
- U.S. Historic district
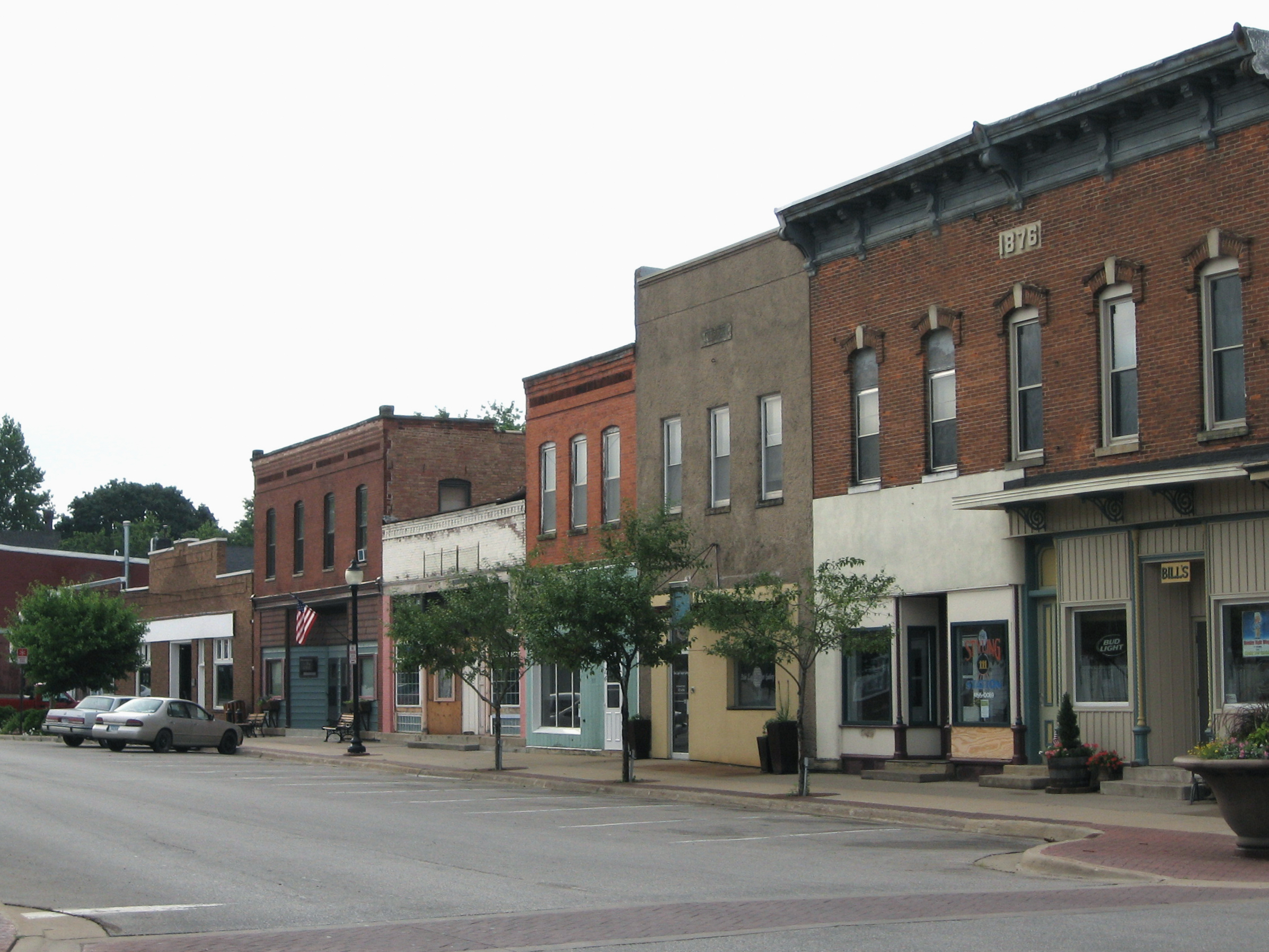
- The south side of East Main Street

- Location within Iowa Location within the United States
- Location: 101-145 E. and W. Main St., 102-122 W. Main St. Lisbon, Iowa
- Coordinates: 41°55′17″N 91°23′08″W
- MPS: Iowa's Main Street Commercial Architecture MPS
- NRHP reference No.: 100004555
- Added to NRHP: November 1, 2019

The Lisbon Main Street Historic District is a nationally recognized historic district located in Lisbon, Iowa, United States. It was listed on the National Register of Historic Places in 2019. At the time of its nomination it consisted of 15 contributing buildings along most of the 100 blocks of East and West Main Street in the central business district. The city was settled by German immigrants who were affiliated with the United Brethren Church. They recruited others from their home area to settle here as well. The railroad was built through town in 1859, and commercial development began thereafter. Most of the historic buildings were constructed between 1875 and 1899 with the Lisbon Library being the oldest.
