= Fred Luderus =

American baseball player (1885–1961)

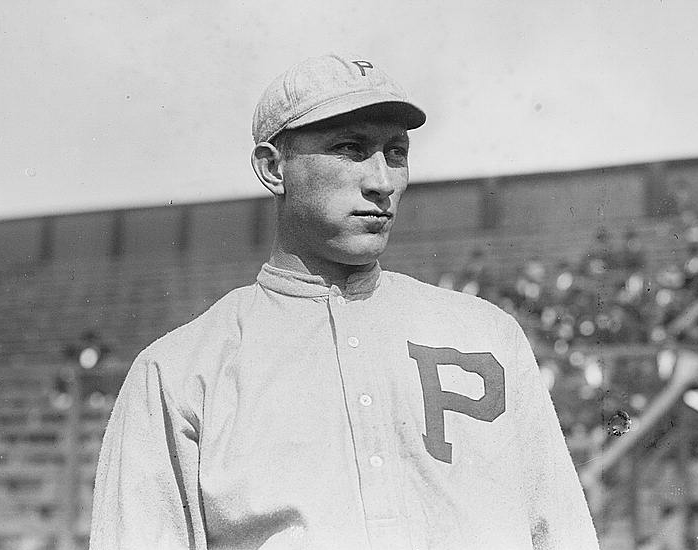
- Luderus in 1911
- First baseman
- Born: September 12, 1885; Milwaukee, Wisconsin, U.S.
- Died: January 5, 1961 (aged 75); Three Lakes, Wisconsin, U.S.
- Batted: Left Threw: Right

MLB debut
- September 23, 1909, for the Chicago Cubs

Last MLB appearance
- June 23, 1920, for the Philadelphia Phillies

MLB statistics
- Batting average: .277
- Home runs: 84
- Runs batted in: 642
- Stats at Baseball Reference

Teams
- Chicago Cubs (1909–1910); Philadelphia Phillies (1910–1920)

Frederick William Luderus (September 12, 1885 – January 5, 1961) was an American professional baseball player who played first base in the major leagues from 1909 to 1920 for the Philadelphia Phillies and Chicago Cubs.

Luderus was a member of the 1915 Phillies team that won the National League pennant. He was the first Phillie to hit a home run in the World Series.

He rebuilt his home in Three Lakes, Wisconsin, with the help of architect, neighbor and Phillies teammate Cy Williams.

In a 12-year, 1346-game major league career, Luderus compiled a .277 batting average (1344-for-4851) with 570 runs, 251 doubles, 54 triples, 84 home runs, 642 RBI, 414 base on balls, 429 strikeouts, .340 on-base percentage and .403 slugging percentage. He recorded a .986 fielding percentage as a first baseman. In the 1915 World Series he batted .438 (7-for-16) with 6 RBI and hit the only home run for the Phillies in Game 5.
