= William H. Yawkey Boathouse =

- U.S. National Register of Historic Places
- Location: 7090 Woodson St. Hazelhurst, Wisconsin
- Coordinates: 45.808335°N 89.718929°W
- Built: 1917
- NRHP reference No.: 09001198
- Added to NRHP: December 30, 2009

The William H. Yawkey Boathouse is located in Hazelhurst, Wisconsin, United States. It was added to the National Register of Historic Places in 2009.

== History ==
Constructed in 1917, the boathouse was owned by William H. Yawkey (1875–1919), who also owned the Detroit Tigers professional baseball team.
