= Yawkey, West Virginia =

- Unincorporated community
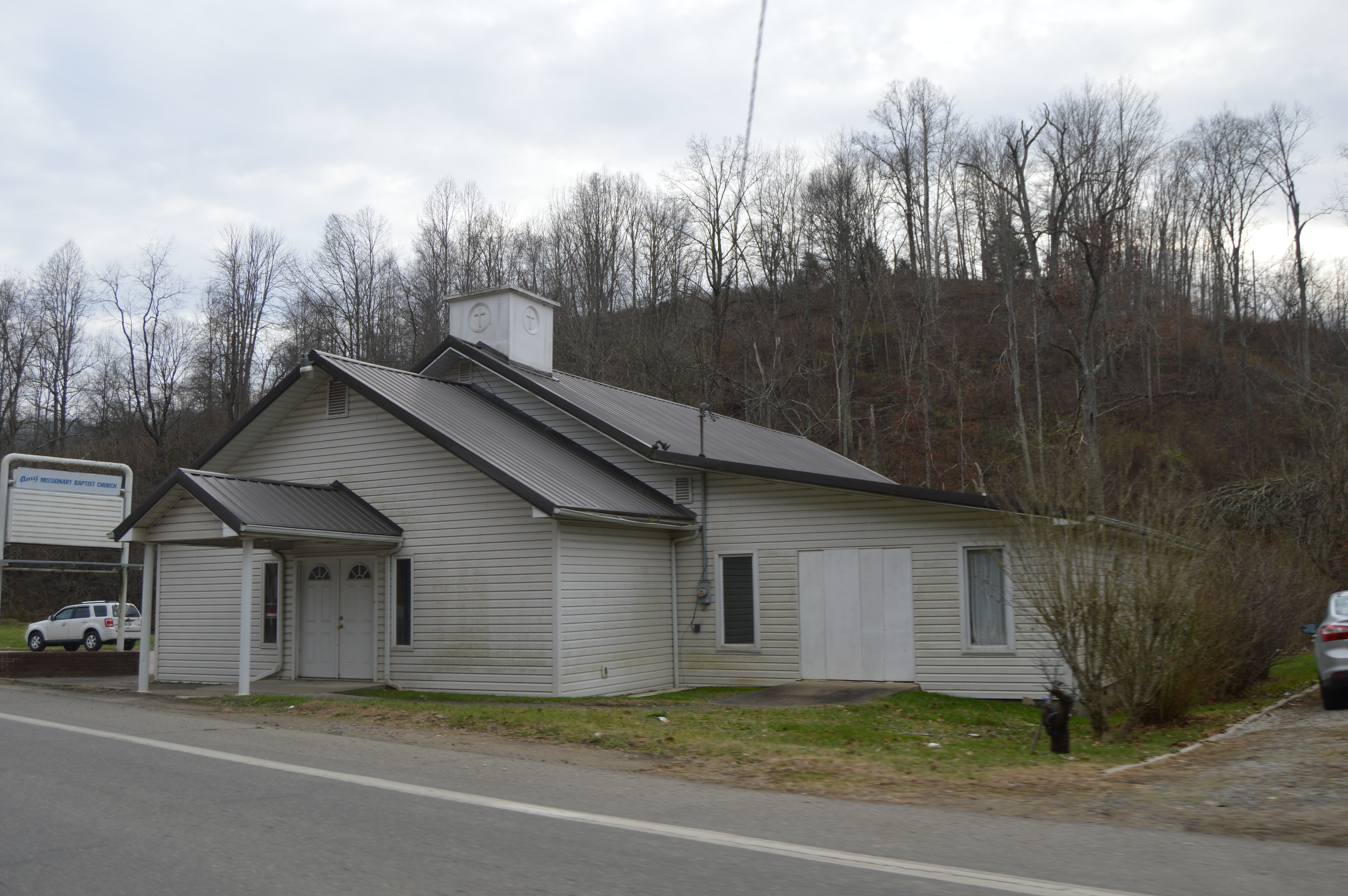
- Amy Missionary Baptist Church

- Location within West Virginia Location within the United States
- Coordinates: 38°13′30″N 81°57′53″W
- Country: United States
- State: West Virginia
- County: Lincoln
- Time zone: UTC-5 (Eastern (EST))
  - Summer (DST): UTC-4 (EDT)
- ZIP codes: 25573

Yawkey (also Porter Fork) is an unincorporated community in eastern Lincoln County, West Virginia, United States. It lies at the intersection of West Virginia Routes 3 and 214, east of the town of Hamlin, the county seat of Lincoln County. Its elevation is 738 feet (225 m). Although it is unincorporated, it had a post office, with the ZIP code 25573.

The community most likely was named after the Yawkey family.

1950s TV personality Dagmar was born in Yawkey.

== Gallery ==
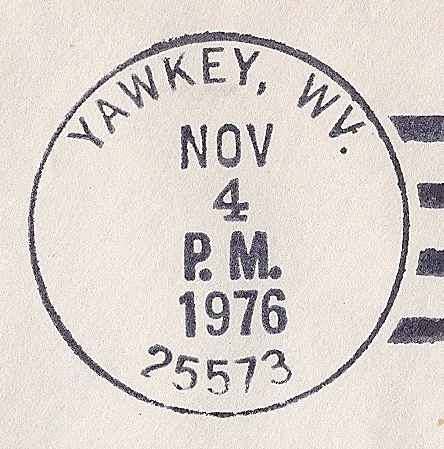
Yawkey postmark
