= Minnesota State Highway 98 =

State highway in Minnesota, United States

Trunk Highway 98
- MN 98 highlighted in red

Route information
- Maintained by MnDOT
- Length: 5 mi (8.0 km)
- Existed: 1933, 1955–1996

Major junctions
- West end: US 61 in Wyoming
- East end: US 8 in Chisago City

Location
- Country: United States
- State: Minnesota
- Counties: Chisago

Highway system
- Minnesota Trunk Highway System; Interstate; US; State; Legislative; Scenic
| ← MN 97 | → MN 99 |

Minnesota State Highway 98 was a highway in Minnesota, which ran from to U.S. Route 61 in Wyoming to U.S. Route 8 in Chisago City. It was decommissioned in 1996 and became Chisago County Road 22.

Highway 98 was also known as Wyoming Trail.

== Route description ==
Highway 98 served to connect U.S. 61 in the city of Wyoming with U.S. 8 in Chisago City. Legally, it followed Minnesota Constitutional Route 46 as defined in the Minnesota Statutes § 161.114.

== History ==
As commissioned in 1933, Highway 98 ran south from Chisago City along what is now County Road 24 between Chisago and Green lakes. It then moved westward along today's County Road 23 and U.S. 8 to Forest Lake. In the mid-1950s, the route was realigned west of Green Lake, and U.S. 8 was moved to this segment, and MN 98 was moved to the former route of 8. Legally, the original route is defined as Route 98 in the Minnesota Statutes § 161.115(29).

Highway 98 was turned back in 1996 and became Chisago County Road 22.

== Major intersections ==
The entire route is in Chisago County.

| Location | mi | km | Destinations | Notes |
|---|---|---|---|---|
| Wyoming | 0 | 0.0 | US 61 | Western terminus |
| Wyoming | 1 | 1.6 | Goodview Avenue | |
| Wyoming | 2 | 3.2 | Pioneer Road | |
| Chisago City | 5 | 8.0 | US 8 | Eastern terminus |
1.000 mi = 1.609 km; 1.000 km = 0.621 mi
