= Hans J. Hagge Boathouse =

- U.S. National Register of Historic Places
- Location: 7720 Newell Rd. Hazelhurst, Wisconsin
- Built: 1938-1939
- Architect: George Grundy/Wilmer Yelton
- NRHP reference No.: 05001493
- Added to NRHP: December 28, 2005

The Hans J. Hagge Boathouse is located in Hazelhurst, Wisconsin, United States. It was added to the National Register of Historic Places in 2005.

== History ==
The boathouse was commissioned by Hans J. Hagge. Hagge was a prominent businessman from Wausau, Wisconsin.
