= Ed Sparr =

American football player (1898–1974)

Edwin Andrew Sparr (July 29, 1898 – May 19, 1974) was an American football player.

Sparr was born in Hazelhurst, Wisconsin. He attended Wausau High School in Wausau, Wisconsin, where he was the team captain in football in 1918. He played tackle at Carroll College for four years and was described as the team's "outstanding grid star". He was chosen all-state three years and graduated following the 1921 season. Afterwards, he served as a teacher at the University of Wisconsin–Madison. In 1926, he joined the Racine Tornadoes of the National Football League (NFL) and appeared in two NFL games for the team, starting one. He became the head coach of a professional team in Two Rivers, Wisconsin, in 1928.
