= Three Lakes (CDP), Wisconsin =

Census-designated place in Wisconsin, United States

Three Lakes, Wisconsin
- Census-designated place
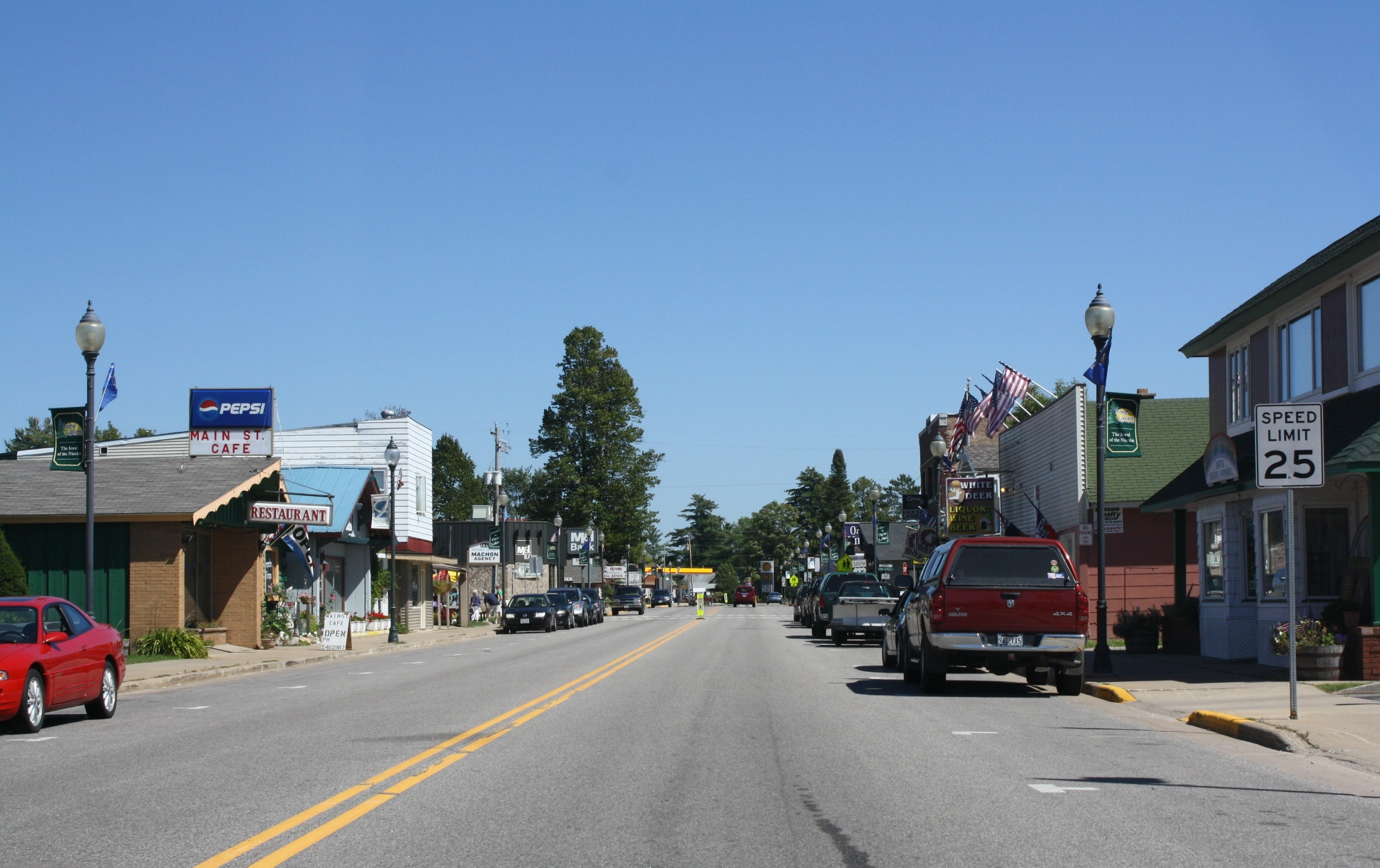
- Downtown Three Lakes

- Location within Wisconsin
- Coordinates: 45°47′54″N 89°09′46″W
- Country: United States
- State: Wisconsin
- County: Oneida

Area
  - Total: 3.054 sq mi (7.91 km^{2})
  - Land: 2.823 sq mi (7.31 km^{2})
  - Water: 0.231 sq mi (0.60 km^{2})
- Elevation: 1,663 ft (507 m)

Population (2020)
  - Total: 605
  - Density: 214/sq mi (82.7/km^{2})
- Time zone: UTC-6 (Central (CST))
  - Summer (DST): UTC-5 (CDT)
- ZIP code: 54562
- Area codes: 715 & 534
- GNIS feature ID: 1575410

Three Lakes is an unincorporated census-designated place located in the town of Three Lakes, Oneida County, Wisconsin, United States. Three Lakes is located at the junction of U.S. Route 45 and Wisconsin Highway 32, 9 miles (14 km) south-southeast of Eagle River. Three Lakes has a post office with ZIP code 54562. As of the 2020 census, its population was 605, representing no change from the 2010 census.

== History ==
A post office called Three Lakes has been in operation since 1885. The community was named from its location near three lakes. As an early railroad was being surveyed, the surveyors had to backtrack and re-route the tracks two times to get around the three lakes. The explanation penciled in on the surveyor's map was 'three lakes', hence where the town got its name. The three lakes the town is named for are Maple Lake, Town Line Lake and Range Lake.

== See also ==
- List of census-designated places in Wisconsin
