= Three Lakes Municipal Airport =

Airport in Wisconsin, United States

- IATA: none; ICAO: none; FAA LID: 40D

Summary
- Airport type: Public
- Owner: Town of Three Lakes
- Serves: Three Lakes, Wisconsin
- Opened: January 1956
- Time zone: CST (UTC−06:00)
  - Summer (DST): CDT (UTC−05:00)
- Elevation AMSL: 1,637 ft (499 m)
- Coordinates: 45°47′24″N 089°07′17″W
- Website: townofthreelakes.com/airport

Map
- Location of airport in Wisconsin 40D (the United States)

Runways
Direction	Length		Surface
Direction	ft	m	Surface
3/21	3,400	1,036	Turf

Statistics
- Aircraft operations (2021): 4,750
- Based aircraft (2024): 8
- Source: Federal Aviation Administration

Three Lakes Municipal Airport, (FAA LID: 40D) is a town owned public use airport located 3 miles (5 km) southeast of the central business district of Three Lakes, Wisconsin, a town in Oneida County, Wisconsin, United States.

Although most airports in the United States use the same three-letter location identifier for the FAA and International Air Transport Association (IATA), this airport is assigned 40D by the FAA but has no designation from the IATA.

The airport does not have scheduled airline service, the closest airport with scheduled airline service is Rhinelander–Oneida County Airport, about 20 miles (32 km) to the southwest.

== Facilities and aircraft ==
Three Lakes Municipal Airport covers an area of 60 acres (24 ha) at an elevation of 1,637 feet (499 m) above mean sea level. It has one runway: 3/21 is 3,400 by 120 feet (1,036 x 37 m) with a turf surface.

For the 12-month period ending August 12, 2021, the airport had 4,750 aircraft operations, an average of 13 per day: 100% general aviation. In August 2024, there were 8 aircraft based at this airport: 6 single-engine, 1 multi-engine and 1 ultralight.

== See also ==
- List of airports in Wisconsin
