= Yawkey (surname) =

Yawkey is a surname. Notable people with the surname include:

- Bill Yawkey (1875–1919), American business executive, owner and president of the Detroit Tigers; uncle of Tom Yawkey
- Cyrus C. Yawkey (1862–1943), American businessman and politician in Wisconsin, cousin of Bill Yawkey
- Jean R. Yawkey (1909–1992), American model, wife of Tom Yawkey and owner of the Boston Red Sox following his death
- Tom Yawkey (1903–1976), American industrialist and owner of the Boston Red Sox
