= Sutliff, Iowa =

- Unincorporated community
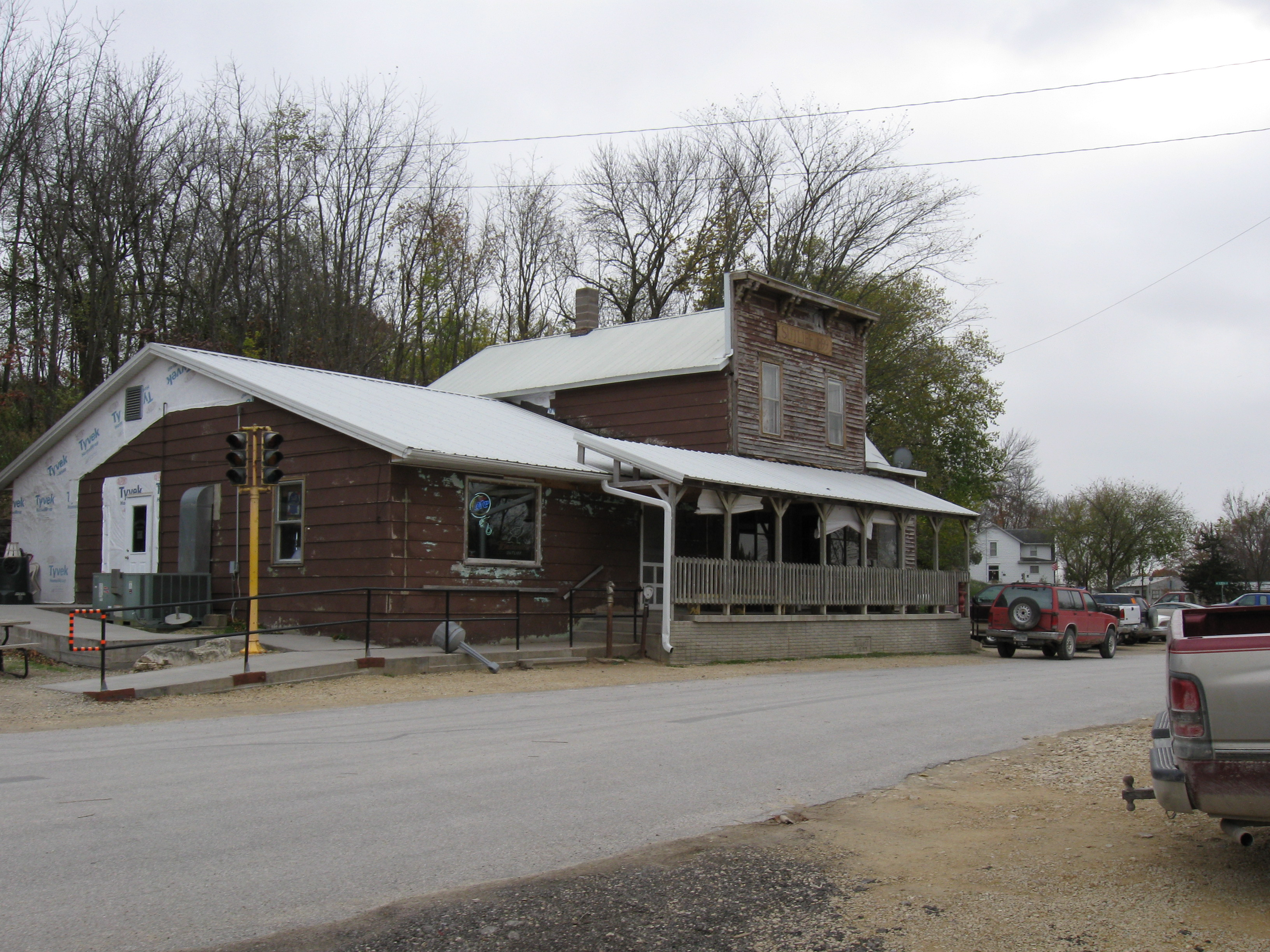
- Baxa's Store and Tavern in Sutliff

- Location within Iowa Location within the United States
- Country: United States
- State: Iowa
- County: Johnson
- Elevation: 689 ft (210 m)
- Time zone: UTC-6 (Central (CST))
  - Summer (DST): UTC-5 (CDT)
- Area code: 319
- GNIS feature ID: 462124

Sutliff (formerly known as Buttsville) is an unincorporated community in Cedar Township, Johnson County, Iowa, United States, just south of Lisbon. The community was founded at the location of Sutliff's ferry. The ferry was operated from 1838 or 1840 onward by Allen (or Allan) C. Sutliff (1796–1873), the elder brother of the Ohio Supreme Court Judge Milton Sutliff (1806–1878). Sutliff, later sold the ferry service to Jim McLellan, whose nickname of "Butts" also tagged the community with the name Buttsville. The community is known for its bridge, listed on the National Register of Historic Places, which was badly damaged during the Iowa Flood of 2008. Baxa's Sutliff Store & Tavern is the main public business. The Sutliff Store has been sitting on the banks of the Cedar River next to the Historic Sutliff Bridge since 1899. The Sutliff Bridge was reconstructed through FEMA funding approved by the Johnson County Board of Supervisors by a 3–2 vote. The reconstruction was supervised by VJ Engineering and construction was completed by Iowa Bridge and Culvert of Washington, Iowa. A ribbon cutting ceremony was held in October 2012 to open the bridge to the public again. It had been closed for four years following the devastation of the 2008 flood.

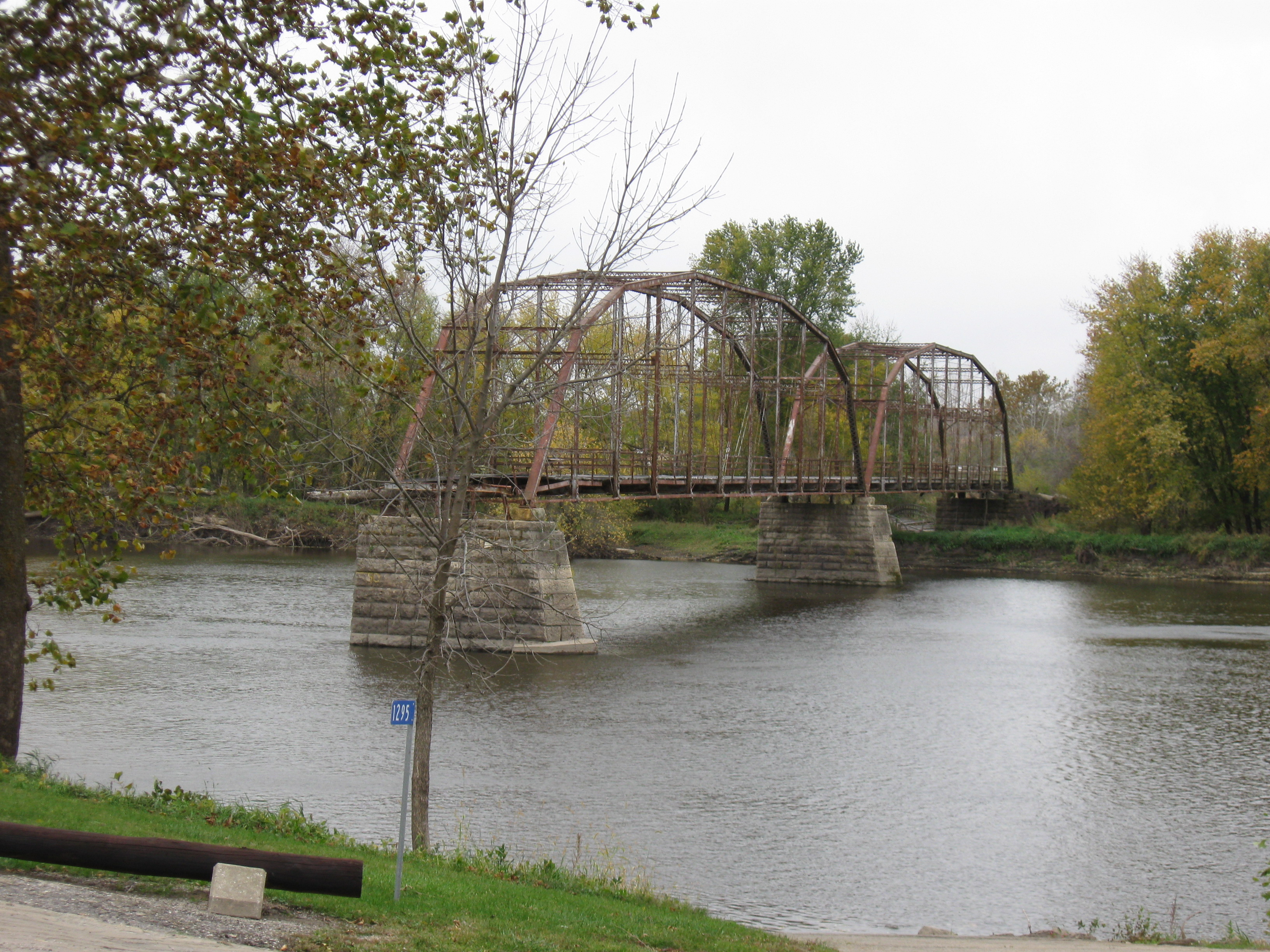
Sutliff Bridge, showing damage from 2008 flood.
