= Hazelhurst (community), Wisconsin =

Hazelhurst, Wisconsin
- Unincorporated community
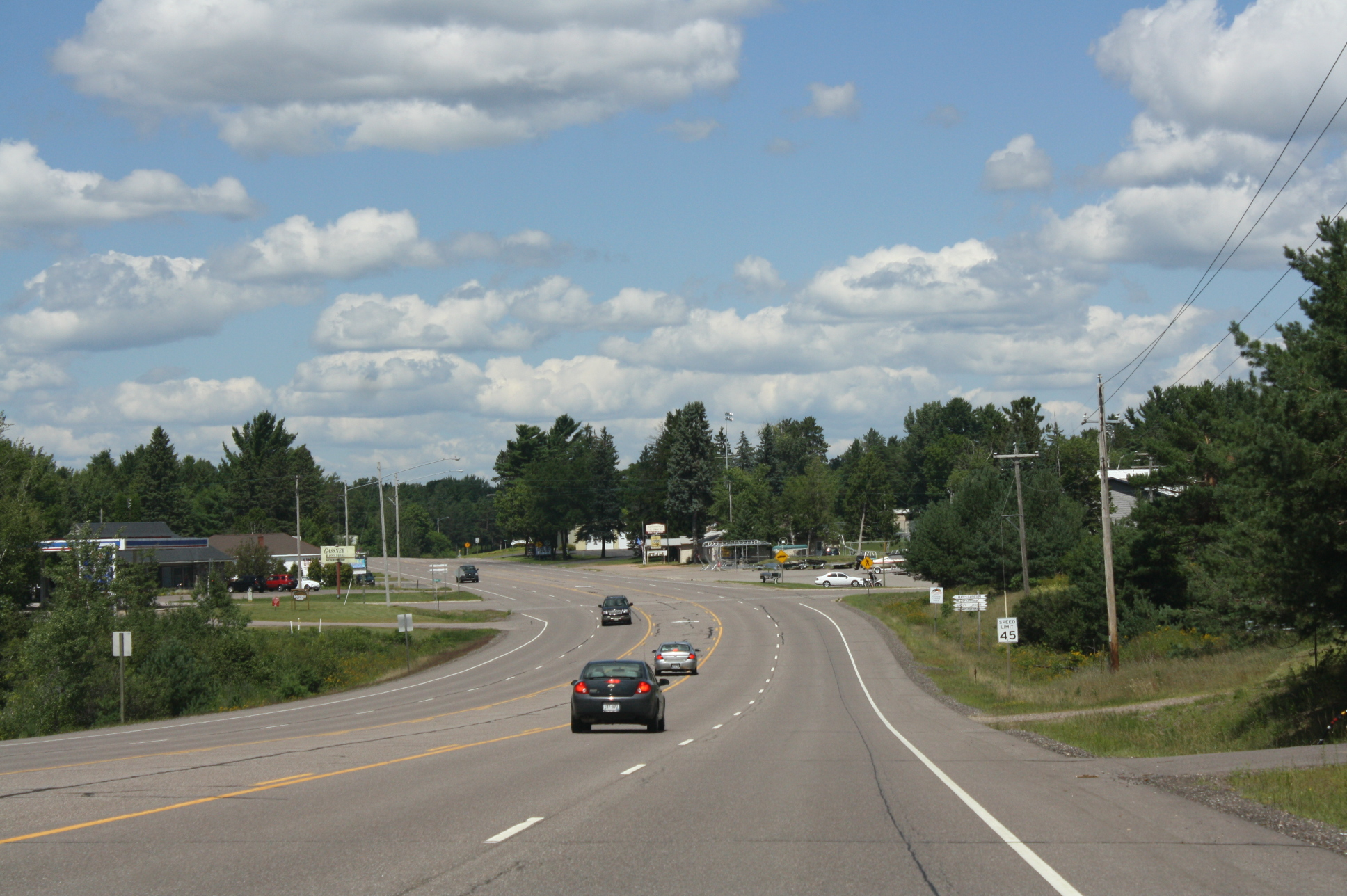
- Looking north at downtown Hazelhurst on U.S. Route 51

- Location within Wisconsin Location within the United States
- Coordinates: 45°48′28″N 89°43′31″W
- Country: United States
- State: Wisconsin
- County: Oneida
- Elevation: 1,611 ft (491 m)
- Time zone: UTC-6 (Central (CST))
  - Summer (DST): UTC-5 (CDT)
- ZIP code: 54531
- Area codes: 715 & 534
- GNIS feature ID: 1566237

Hazelhurst is an unincorporated community located in the town of Hazelhurst, Oneida County, Wisconsin, United States. Hazelhurst is located on U.S. Route 51, 19 miles (31 km) northwest of Rhinelander. Hazelhurst has a post office with ZIP code 54531.

== History ==
Businessman Cyrus C. Yawkey started a sawmill in present-day Hazelhurst which became the Yawkey Lumber Company. Yawkey served on the Hazelhurst town board, the Oneida County board of supervisors, and the Wisconsin State Assembly.

== Images ==
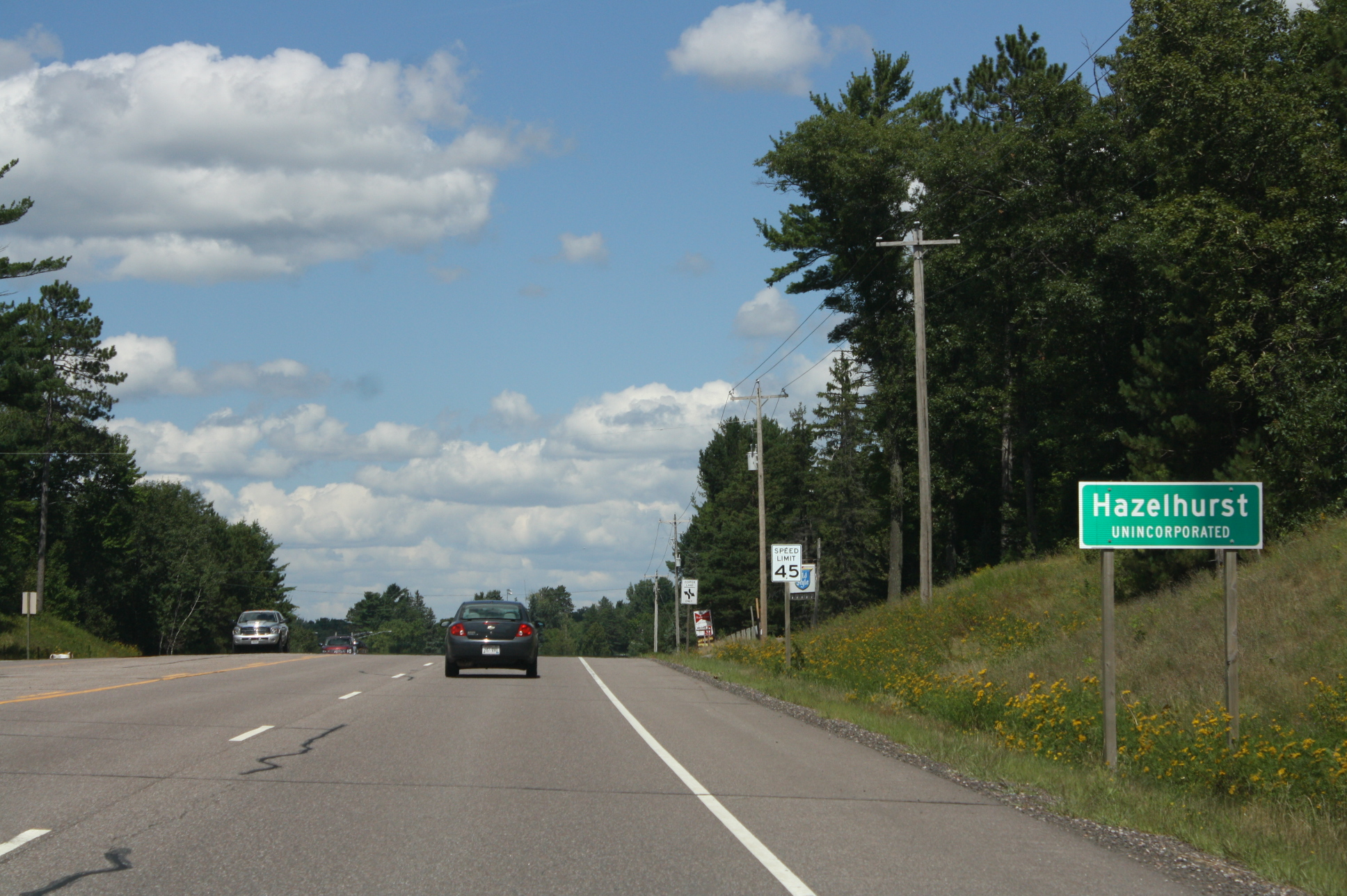
Sign on U.S. 51

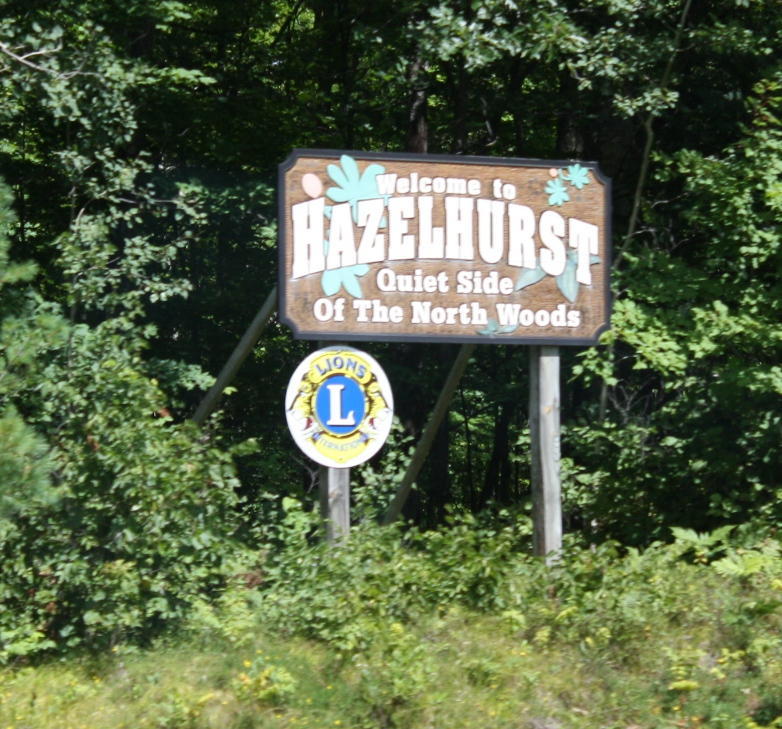
Welcome sign

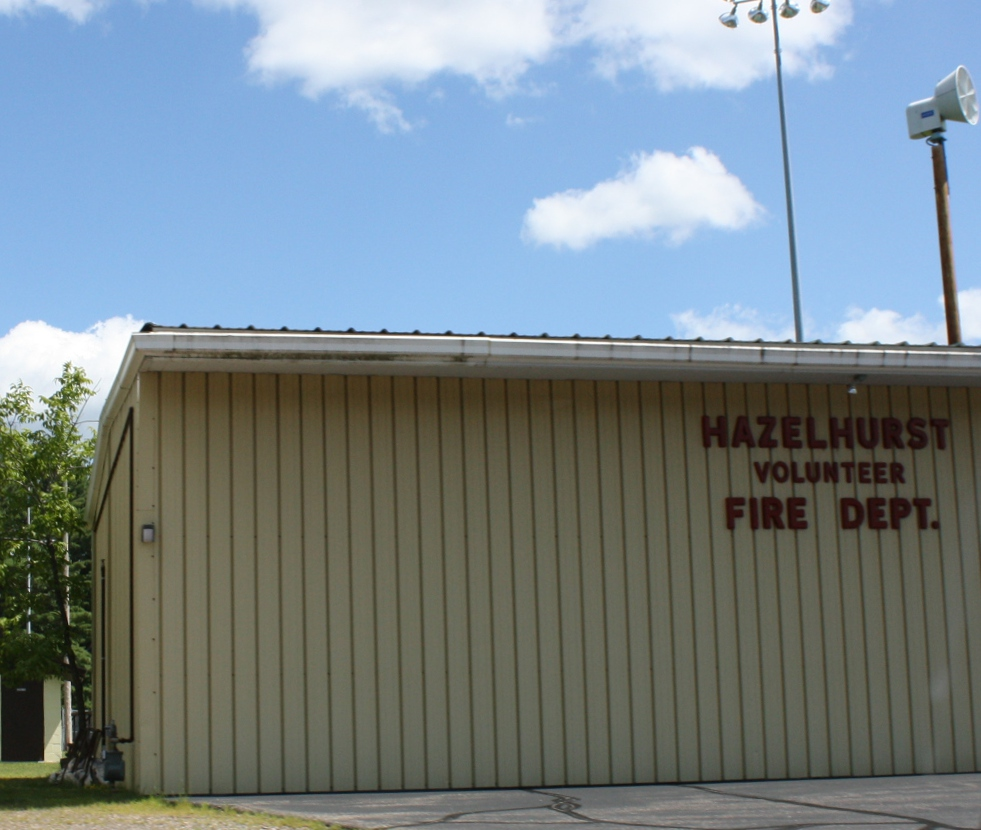
Fire Department
