= Wyoming, Minnesota =

City in Minnesota, United States

Wyoming
- City
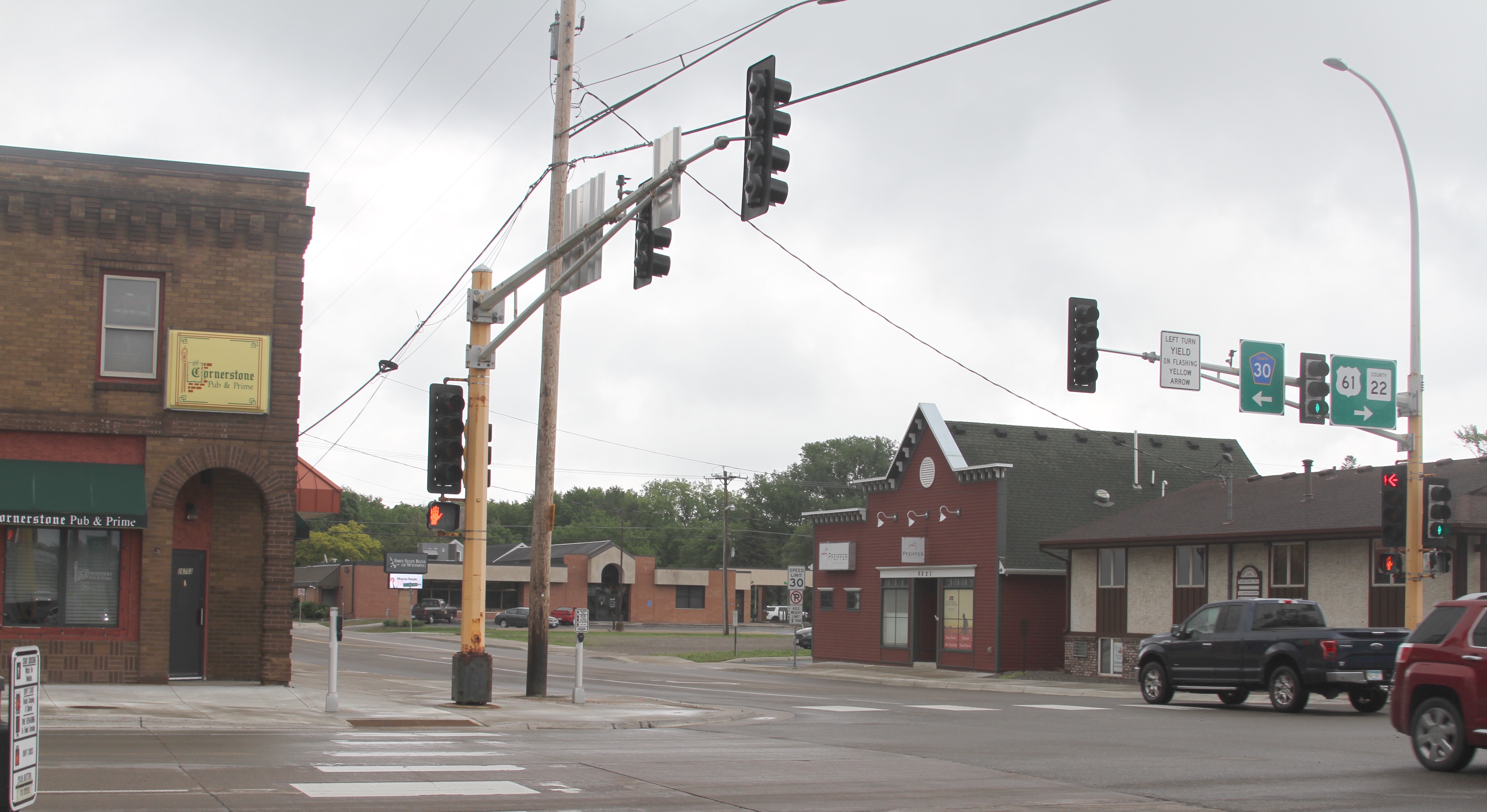
- Business district

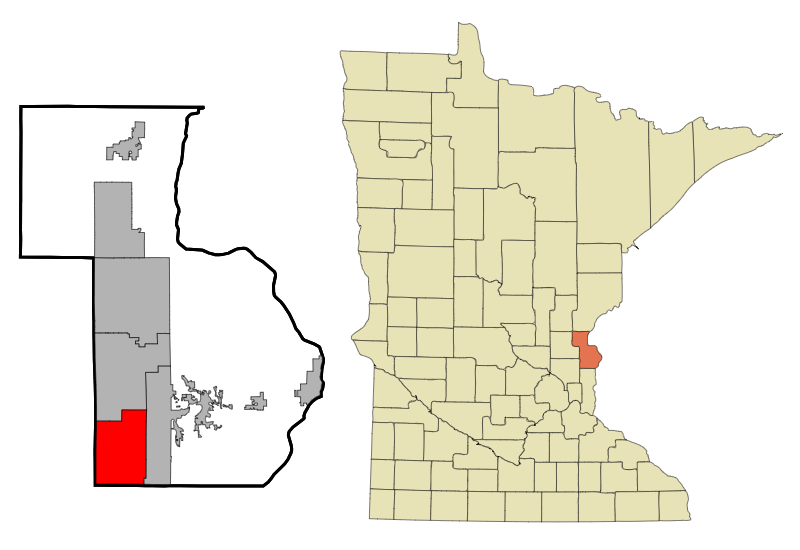
- Location of the city of Wyoming within Chisago County, Minnesota
- Coordinates: 45°20′6″N 92°59′37″W
- Country: United States
- State: Minnesota
- County: Chisago

Area
  - Total: 21.68 sq mi (56.16 km^{2})
  - Land: 20.65 sq mi (53.49 km^{2})
  - Water: 1.03 sq mi (2.67 km^{2})
- Elevation: 899 ft (274 m)

Population (2020)
  - Total: 8,032
  - Density: 388.9/sq mi (150.16/km^{2})
- Time zone: UTC-6 (Central (CST))
  - Summer (DST): UTC-5 (CDT)
- ZIP code: 55092
- Area code: 651
- FIPS code: 27-72022
- GNIS feature ID: 2397388
- Website: www.wyomingmn.org

Wyoming is a city in Chisago County, Minnesota. The population was 8,032 at the 2020 census.

== History ==
Wyoming was platted in 1869 when the St. Paul and Duluth Railroad was extended to that point. The city took its name from Wyoming Township.

Wyoming served as the drop-off point for a Depression era kidnapping. In June 1933, William Hamm of Hamm's Brewery was released by his captors, the Barker–Karpis gang, following collection of a $100,000 ransom payment ($1.825 mil. in 2015 dollars).

== Geography ==
According to the United States Census Bureau, the city has a total area of 21.29 square miles (55.14 km^{2}), of which 20.26 square miles (52.47 km^{2}) is land and 1.03 square miles (2.67 km^{2}) is water. Wyoming is located along the South Branch of the Sunrise River.

Interstate 35 serves as a main route for the community.

== Demographics ==
Historical population
Census	Pop.	Note	%±
1910	207		—
1920	253		22.2%
1930	214		−15.4%
1940	253		18.2%
1950	325		28.5%
1960	435		33.8%
1970	695		59.8%
1980	1,559		124.3%
1990	2,142		37.4%
2000	3,048		42.3%
2010	7,791		155.6%
2020	8,032		3.1%
U.S. Decennial Census

=== 2020 census ===
As of the 2020 census, Wyoming had a population of 8,032. The median age was 40.9 years. 24.0% of residents were under the age of 18 and 14.6% of residents were 65 years of age or older. For every 100 females there were 102.3 males, and for every 100 females age 18 and over there were 101.9 males age 18 and over.

48.9% of residents lived in urban areas, while 51.1% lived in rural areas.

There were 2,909 households in Wyoming, of which 33.7% had children under the age of 18 living in them. Of all households, 63.1% were married-couple households, 13.8% were households with a male householder and no spouse or partner present, and 16.3% were households with a female householder and no spouse or partner present. About 19.6% of all households were made up of individuals and 10.0% had someone living alone who was 65 years of age or older.

There were 2,995 housing units, of which 2.9% were vacant. The homeowner vacancy rate was 0.9% and the rental vacancy rate was 3.4%.

Racial composition as of the 2020 census
Race	Number	Percent
White	7,359	91.6%
Black or African American	49	0.6%
American Indian and Alaska Native	28	0.3%
Asian	108	1.3%
Native Hawaiian and Other Pacific Islander	0	0.0%
Some other race	75	0.9%
Two or more races	413	5.1%
Hispanic or Latino (of any race)	238	3.0%

=== 2010 census ===
As of the census of 2010, there were 7,791 people, 2,738 households, and 2,154 families living in the city. The population density was 384.6 inhabitants per square mile (148.5/km^{2}). There were 2,845 housing units at an average density of 140.4 per square mile (54.2/km^{2}). The racial makeup of the city was 96.6% White, 0.4% African American, 0.4% Native American, 0.9% Asian, 0.4% from other races, and 1.4% from two or more races. Hispanic or Latino of any race were 1.7% of the population.

There were 2,738 households, of which 41.7% had children under the age of 18 living with them, 65.9% were married couples living together, 8.2% had a female householder with no husband present, 4.6% had a male householder with no wife present, and 21.3% were non-families. 16.6% of all households were made up of individuals, and 8% had someone living alone who was 65 years of age or older. The average household size was 2.84 and the average family size was 3.19.

The median age in the city was 38.4 years. 28.4% of residents were under the age of 18. 7.1% were between the ages of 18 and 24; 25.8% were from 25 to 44; 29.8% were from 45 to 64; and 8.9% were 65 years of age or older. The gender makeup of the city was 50.3% male and 49.7% female.

=== 2000 census ===
As of the census of 2000, there were 3,048 people, 1,023 households, and 848 families living in the city. The population density was 1,069.8 inhabitants per square mile (413.1/km^{2}). There were 1,055 housing units at an average density of 370.3 per square mile (143.0/km^{2}). The racial makeup of the city was 97.64% White, 0.39% African American, 0.52% Native American, 0.43% Asian, 0.07% Pacific Islander, 0.26% from other races, and 0.69% from two or more races. Hispanic or Latino of any race were 0.72% of the population.

There were 1,023 households, out of which 50.1% had children under the age of 18 living with them, 69.2% were married couples living together, 10.9% had a female householder with no husband present, and 17.1% were non-families. 13.3% of all households were made up of individuals, and 5.5% had someone living alone who was 65 years of age or older. The average household size was 2.94 and the average family size was 3.23.

In the city, the population was spread out, with 32.6% under the age of 18, 7.1% from 18 to 24, 33.6% from 25 to 44, 19.7% from 45 to 64, and 7.0% who were 65 years of age or older. The median age was 32 years. For every 100 females, there were 97.8 males. For every 100 females age 18 and over, there were 94.7 males.

The median income for a household in the city was $56,192, and the median income for a family was $62,118. Males had a median income of $40,959 versus $28,272 for females. The per capita income for the city was $20,290. About 2.7% of families and 5.5% of the population were below the poverty line, including 4.7% of those under age 18 and 11.2% of those age 65 or over.

== See also ==
- Arrowhead Transit
- U.S. Route 61 in Minnesota
- Old Minnesota State Highway 98 – also known back in the wagon days as Wyoming Trail, as it was a trail to the many stagecoach stops to the Twin Cities. In the present day, this route is now marked as Chisago County Road 22.
