= Sutliff Bridge =

- U.S. National Register of Historic Places
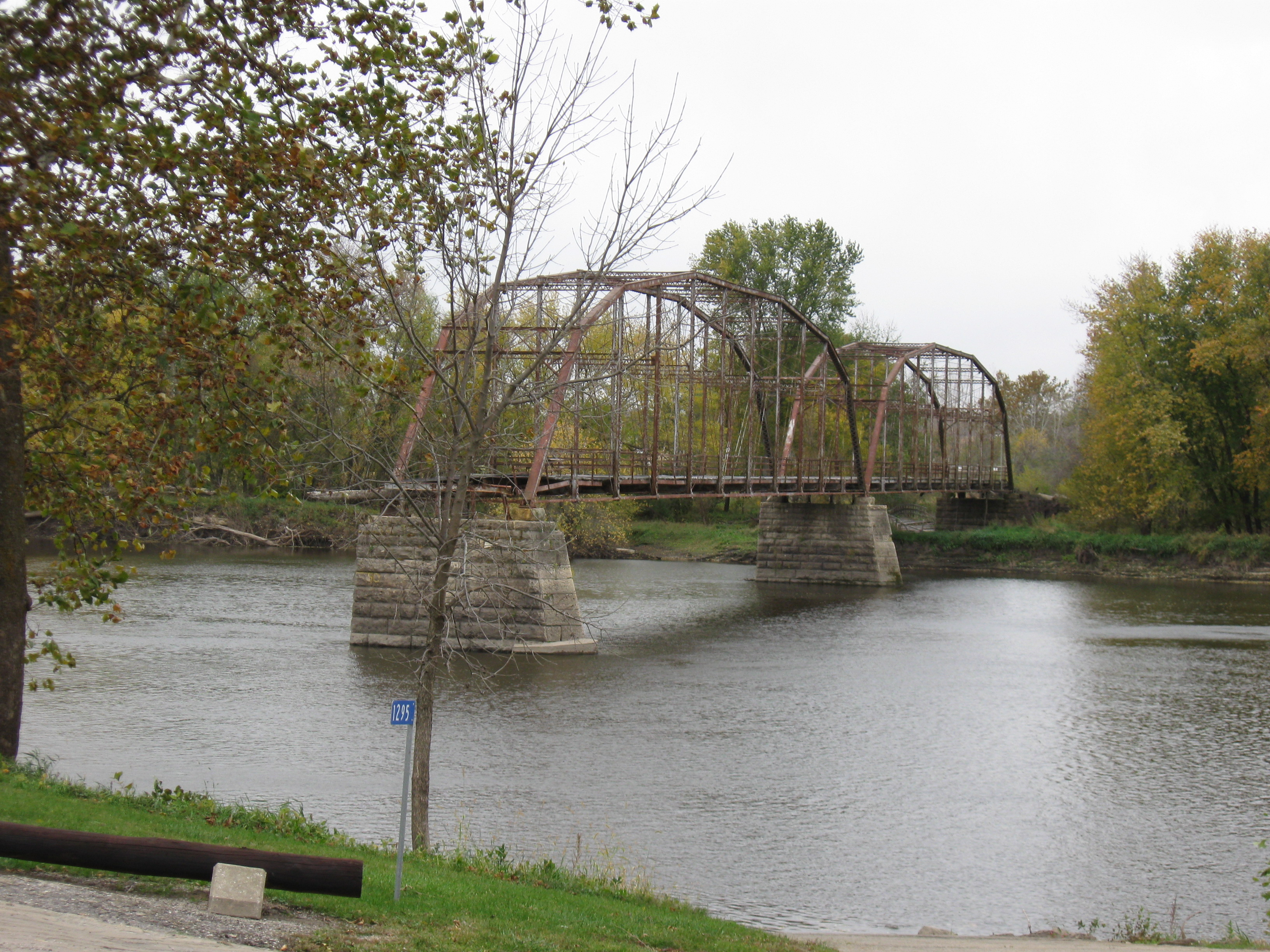
- Sutliff Bridge after 2008 flooding

- Location within Iowa Location within the United States
- Location: Sutliff Road over Cedar River
- Nearest city: Sutliff, Iowa
- Coordinates: 41°50′23″N 91°23′33″W
- Built: 1897
- Architect: G. W. Wynn; Jones & Laughlin Company
- MPS: Highway Bridges of Iowa MPS
- NRHP reference No.: 98000520
- Added to NRHP: May 15, 1998

The Sutliff Bridge is a bridge over the Cedar River at Sutliff, a Johnson County community near Lisbon, Iowa, United States. A Parker truss bridge, it was built in 1897 and 1898 at a cost of approximately $12,000. J. R. Sheely was the engineer for the original Sutliff Bridge. After a modern replacement was built over the Cedar in 1983, the bridge was slated for destruction, but it was ultimately saved, and on May 15, 1998, it was added to the National Register of Historic Places.

Although the bridge remained a celebrated location for locals and for visitors from across Iowa, including a 5k foot race beloved as the “worst road race in America", it succumbed to massive floods in the second week of June 2008: while the river normally flowed many feet below the bottom of the bridge, the floods topped the bridge's deck, and one of the bridge's spans was washed away on June 13 as the surrounding countryside was inundated with vast amounts of water. It is estimated that restoring the bridge will cost $1.7 million. Most of this money would come from the Federal Emergency Management Agency (FEMA), with the rest coming from donations and local governments; both FEMA and the Johnson County Board of Supervisors have agreed in principle to repair the bridge. The bridge reconstruction was supervised by VJ Engineering of Coralville, Iowa, and construction was completed by Iowa Bridge and Culvert of Washington, Iowa. In October 2012 a ribbon-cutting ceremony was held, opening the bridge to public use for the first time in four years.

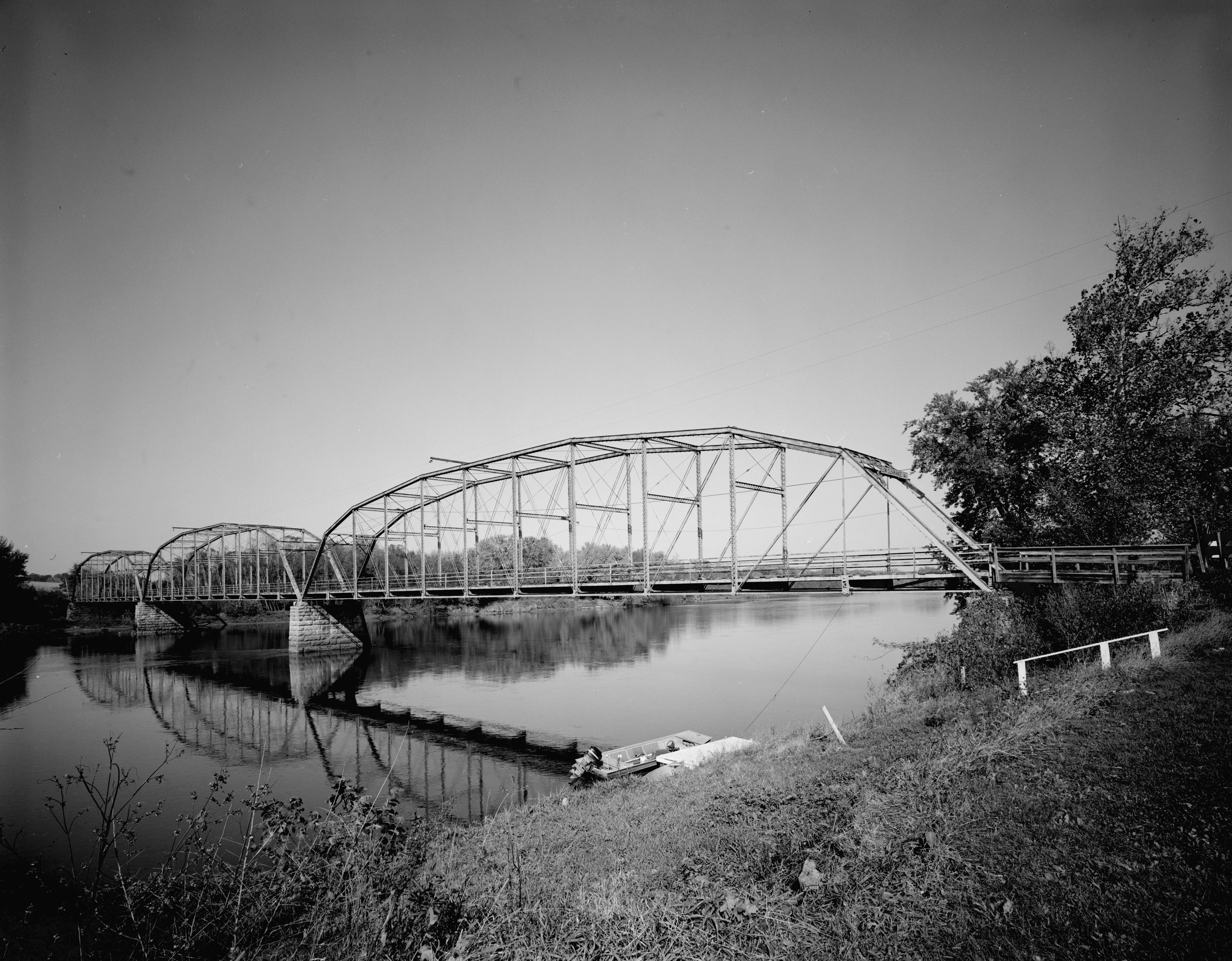
Sutliff Bridge before its collapse

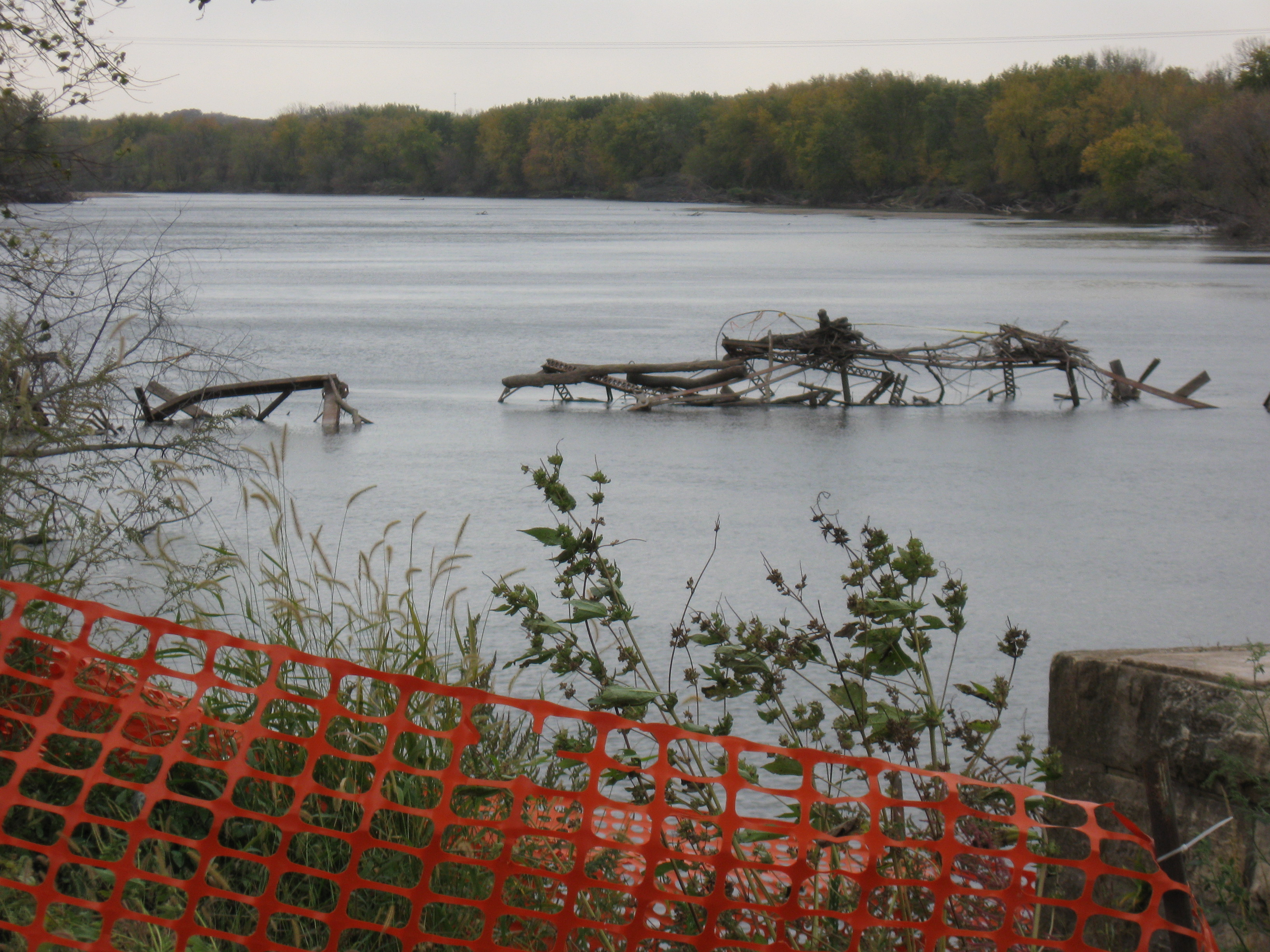
Sutliff Bridge truss badly damaged in the 2008 flood, downstream from the bridge

== See also ==
- List of bridges documented by the Historic American Engineering Record in Iowa
- List of bridges on the National Register of Historic Places in Iowa
