= Joseph and Augusta Trunck Boathouse =

- U.S. National Register of Historic Places
- Location: 1000 Leatzow Rd. Three Lakes, Wisconsin
- Built: 1928
- NRHP reference No.: 08000750
- Added to NRHP: August 1, 2008

The Joseph and Augusta Trunck Boathouse is located in Three Lakes, Wisconsin, United States. It was added to the National Register of Historic Places in 2008.

== Description ==
The boathouse is located on a lake that is part of the noted Eagle River chain of lakes. It features a gambrel roof and rests upon fitted tree trunks driven into the sand and gravel lake bottom.
