= Reay Boathouse =

- U.S. National Register of Historic Places
- Location within Wisconsin Location within the United States
- Location: 1260 Honk Hill Rd. Three Lakes, Wisconsin
- Coordinates: 45°48′28″N 89°07′35″W
- Built: 1928
- NRHP reference No.: 04000730
- Added to NRHP: July 21, 2004

The Reay Boathouse is located in Three Lakes, Wisconsin, United States. It was added to the National Register of Historic Places in 2004.

== Description ==
The boathouse is two stories tall. It features boat slips on the lower level and a recreation room on the upper level.
