= Indianapolis Outing Club =

- U.S. National Register of Historic Places
- Location: Three Lakes, Wisconsin
- Built: 1902
- NRHP reference No.: 04000156
- Added to NRHP: March 10, 2004

The Indianapolis Outing Club is located in Three Lakes, Wisconsin. In 2004, the site was added to the National Register of Historic Places.

== History ==
In 1902, the land that the buildings of the club now sit on was purchased by businessmen from Indiana and Kentucky. By that time, Oneida County, Wisconsin and Vilas County, Wisconsin had the greatest concentration of commercial resorts in the upper area of the Great Lakes region and the businessmen had decided to begin an exclusive club. They would construct four buildings on the site.
