= Marshall D. Miller Boathouse =

- U.S. National Register of Historic Places
- Location: 7304 Campground Rd. Three Lakes, Wisconsin
- Built: 1920
- NRHP reference No.: 08000747
- Added to NRHP: August 1, 2008

The Marshall D. Miller Boathouse is located in Three Lakes, Wisconsin, United States. It was added to the National Register of Historic Places in 2008.

== History ==
The house was constructed by Marshall D. Miller on the north shore of Laurel Lake. In 1949, it was moved to the northern side of the lake.
