= Three Lakes, Wisconsin =

Three Lakes
- Town
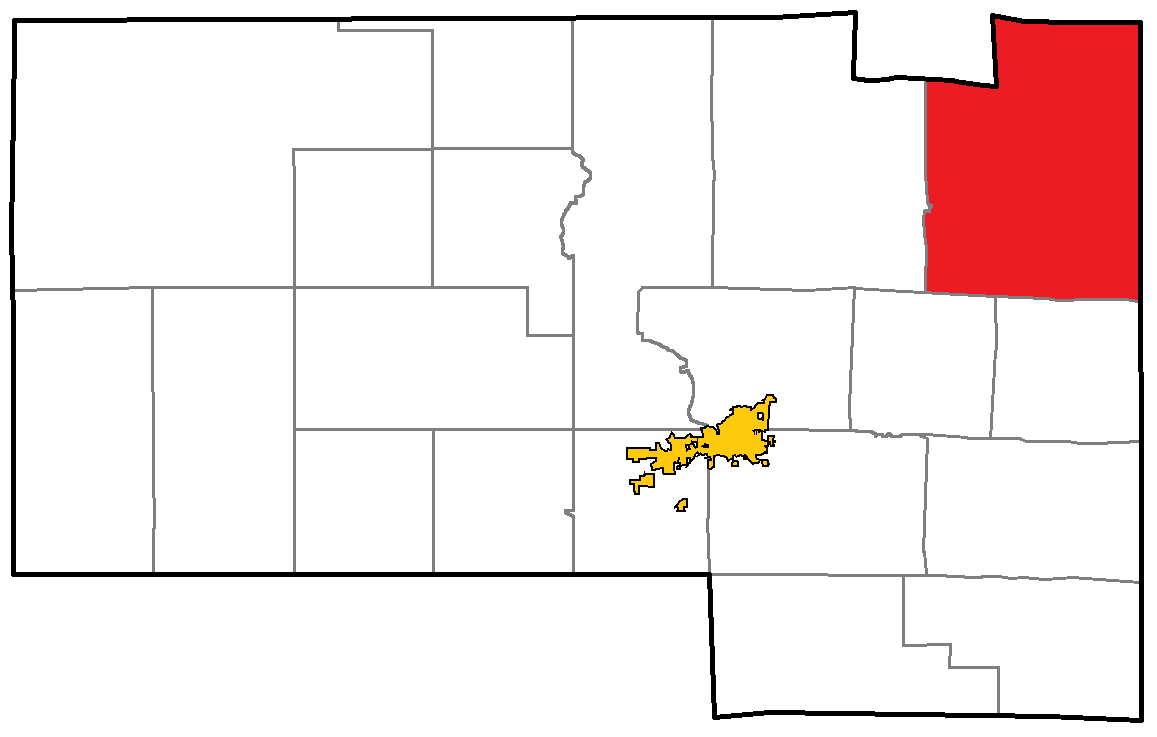
- Location of Three Lakes, within Oneida County

- Location within Wisconsin Three Lakes (the United States)
- Coordinates: 45°47′54″N 89°9′46″W
- Country: United States
- State: Wisconsin
- County: Oneida

Area
  - Total: 99.9 sq mi (258.7 km^{2})
  - Land: 81.5 sq mi (211.1 km^{2})
  - Water: 18.4 sq mi (47.6 km^{2})
- Elevation: 1,657 ft (505 m)

Population (2020)
  - Total: 2,413
  - Density: 29.61/sq mi (11.43/km^{2})
- Time zone: UTC-6 (CST)
  - Summer (DST): UTC-5 (CDT)
- ZIP Code: 54562
- Area codes: 715 & 534
- FIPS code: 55-79700
- GNIS feature ID: 1584277
- Website: https://townofthreelakeswi.gov/

Three Lakes is a town in Oneida County, Wisconsin, United States. The population was 2,413 at the 2020 census. The census-designated place of Three Lakes is located in the town. The unincorporated community of Clearwater Lake is also located in the town.

== History ==
Three Lakes, Wisconsin was named for the three lakes the Milwaukee, Lake Shore and Western Railway encountered while developing a new route due north to Watersmeet, Michigan and then west to Ashland, Wisconsin: The railway route diverted slightly west around the three lakes which were named Maple, Townline, and Range Line lakes. It formally became a town in 1881.

The early industry in the town was logging and forestry. Three Lakes and the rest of the Northwoods supplied wood to build Chicago after the Great Chicago Fire of 1871. During that time, most of the area's virgin forests were cleared and it was only in the 1930s that a process began to replant them. As a result of these replanting efforts, logging and forestry continue to be an important industry in Three Lakes.

As the logging industry moved out of the area, many of the cleared areas were converted to potato farms and agriculture became the community's primary industry through the early 1900s. However, over time these family potato farms were replaced by larger corporate commercial enterprises, which are no longer in production.

Three Lakes began growing as a tourist and summer vacation destination in the late 1930s. The increasing availability of automobiles, combined with the roads that existed from the logging industry, made the lakes and forests of the Three Lakes area an attractive vacation destination. Tourism was the primary industry in Three Lakes beginning in the 1970s and continues to be today.

The town also has light manufacturing, a winery, an arts center and numerous retail businesses that have diversified its economy. The town has made substantial investments in developing high speed Internet and broadband capabilities.

== Geography ==
According to the United States Census Bureau, the town has a total area of 99.9 square miles (258.7 km^{2}), of which 81.5 square miles (211.1 km^{2}) is land and 18.4 square miles (47.6 km^{2}) (18.40%) is water. The Eagle River flows through the town in a series of lakes.

=== Climate ===
The climate is described as Humid Continental by the Köppen Climate System, abbreviated as Dfb.

Climate data for Three Lakes, Wisconsin
Month	Jan	Feb	Mar	Apr	May	Jun	Jul	Aug	Sep	Oct	Nov	Dec	Year
Mean daily maximum °C (°F)	−6 (22)	−3 (26)	3 (37)	11 (52)	19 (66)	24 (75)	26 (79)	24 (76)	19 (67)	13 (56)	3 (38)	−3 (26)	11 (52)
Mean daily minimum °C (°F)	−18 (−1)	−18 (0)	−12 (10)	−4 (25)	3 (37)	8 (47)	11 (52)	9 (49)	6 (42)	0 (32)	−7 (20)	−14 (6)	−3 (27)
Average precipitation mm (inches)	30 (1.2)	25 (1)	41 (1.6)	61 (2.4)	84 (3.3)	100 (4.1)	99 (3.9)	100 (4)	97 (3.8)	64 (2.5)	56 (2.2)	36 (1.4)	800 (31.5)
Source: Weatherbase

== Demographics ==
As of the Census 2000, there were 2,339 people, 1,031 households, and 691 families residing in the town. The population density was 28.7 people per square mile (11.1/km^{2}). There were 2,908 housing units at an average density of 35.7 per square mile (13.8/km^{2}). The racial makeup of the town was 98.16% White, 0.17% African American, 0.13% Native American, 0.43% Asian, 0.09% Pacific Islander, and 1.03% from two or more races. Hispanic or Latino of any race were 0.86% of the population.

There were 1,031 households, out of which 22.2% had children under the age of 18 living with them, 57.3% were married couples living together, 5.6% had a female householder with no husband present, and 32.9% were non-families. 27.6% of all households were made up of individuals, and 16.2% had someone living alone who was 65 years of age or older. The average household size was 2.24 and the average family size was 2.74.

In the town, the population was spread out, with 21.5% under the age of 18, 4.1% from 18 to 24, 22.0% from 25 to 44, 27.4% from 45 to 64, and 25.0% who were 65 years of age or older. The median age was 47 years. For every 100 females, there were 105.7 males. For every 100 females age 18 and over, there were 104.1 males.

The median income for a household in the town was $32,798, and the median income for a family was $38,098. Males had a median income of $31,638 versus $19,773 for females. The per capita income for the town was $17,758. About 5.4% of families and 6.7% of the population were below the poverty line, including 1.6% of those under age 18 and 6.8% of those age 65 or over.

== Transportation ==
Three Lakes Municipal Airport (40D) is located 3 miles (5 km) southeast of the town and provides general aviation services. Commercial airline service for the community is provided by the Rhinelander-Oneida County Airport.

== Culture ==
Three Lakes is home to the Three Lakes Center for the Arts, which was built by the Seabees during World War II as a Quonset hut theater. It is one of fewer than five Quonset hut theaters in the country. The building came to Three Lakes in 1946 and was completely renovated starting in 2009.

The Center houses an art gallery and a theater. The art gallery presents work from a rotating group of local and national artists, while the 100-seat theater presents first-run movies and live musical events. The center sponsors summer adult art classes taught by local and visiting artists. It works cooperatively with local schools, presenting performances for school students and offering free summer arts classes at Maple Lake Pavilion. The Three Lakes Center for the Arts also runs annual events such as Art on Main, Affair of the Arts, Pumpkin Fest, and Oktoberfest.

== Recreation ==
As part of the Chequamegon-Nicolet National Forest, Three Lakes, Wisconsin has access to hunting, snowmobiling, biking, birdwatching, camping, and hiking trails.

Three Lakes is part of the Eagle River-Three Lakes chain of lakes. The Three Lakes part of the chain starts with the Burnt Rollways Reservoir and includes 20 lakes ranging in size from 123 acres to 1012 acres. Water skiing, boating and wakeboarding are popular activities on the lakes. They are also known for their muskie and walleye fishing.

== Historic places ==
Locations in Three Lakes listed on the National Register of Historic Places include:

- George P. Mayer Boathouse
- Indianapolis Outing Club
- Joseph and Augusta Trunck Boathouse
- Marshall D. Miller Boathouse
- Reay Boathouse

== Notable people ==
- Sam Campbell, Author and Conservationist
- Marie Kazmierczak, All-American Girls Professional Baseball League player
- Fred Luderus, Major League Baseball player
- Ray Meyer, member of the Naismith Memorial Basketball Hall of Fame
- Cy Williams, Major League Baseball player

== See also ==
- Three Lakes High School
