= Phillip Orth Boathouse =

- U.S. National Register of Historic Places
- Location: 9204 Country Club Rd. Minocqua, Wisconsin
- Built: 1926
- Architect: A. H. Rantz
- NRHP reference No.: 05001492
- Added to NRHP: December 28, 2005

The Phillip Orth Boathouse is located in Minocqua, Wisconsin, United States. It was added to the National Register of Historic Places in 2005.

== Description ==
The boathouse is located on the southern shore of Lake Minocqua. It is two stories tall with a hip roof and casement windows.
