= George P. Mayer Boathouse =

- U.S. National Register of Historic Places
- Location: 7708 Braeger Rd. Three Lakes, Wisconsin
- NRHP reference No.: 11000115
- Added to NRHP: March 21, 2011

The George P. Mayer Boathouse is located in Three Lakes, Wisconsin, United States. It was added to the National Register of Historic Places in 2011.

== Description ==
The boathouse is two stories tall with a hip roof. Boat slips are located on the first floor with entertaining and living spaces located on the second floor.
