= Cyrus C. Yawkey =

American politician and business executive in lumber

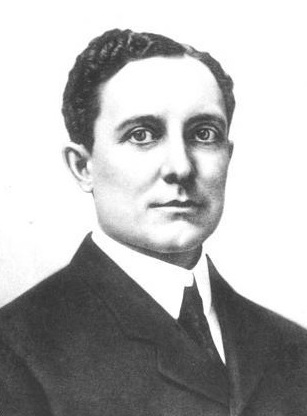
- Yawkey, c. 1905
- Born: August 29, 1862; Chicago, Illinois
- Died: May 18, 1943 (aged 80); Wausau, Wisconsin
- Occupations: Lumber executive; Member of the Wisconsin State Assembly (1895–1896)

Cyrus Carpenter Yawkey (August 29, 1862 – May 18, 1943), commonly known as C. C. Yawkey, was an American business executive in lumber, and politician in Wisconsin.

== Biography ==
Born in Chicago, Illinois, Yawkey moved with his family to Saginaw, Michigan, where he was educated. He started out as a clerk and then owned a business. He then moved to Wisconsin and started a sawmill in present-day Hazelhurst. He served on the Hazelhurst town board and the Oneida County board of supervisors. In 1895–1896, he served in the Wisconsin State Assembly as a Republican. In 1899, he moved to Wausau, Wisconsin, where he had his lumber business. During World War I, he was a colonel in the Wisconsin National Guard. Yawkey died in May 1943 in Wausau, Wisconsin.

A cousin, William H. Yawkey, owned the Detroit Tigers baseball team.
