= Solon and Mathilda Sutliff House =

Historic house in Wisconsin, United States

- U.S. National Register of Historic Places
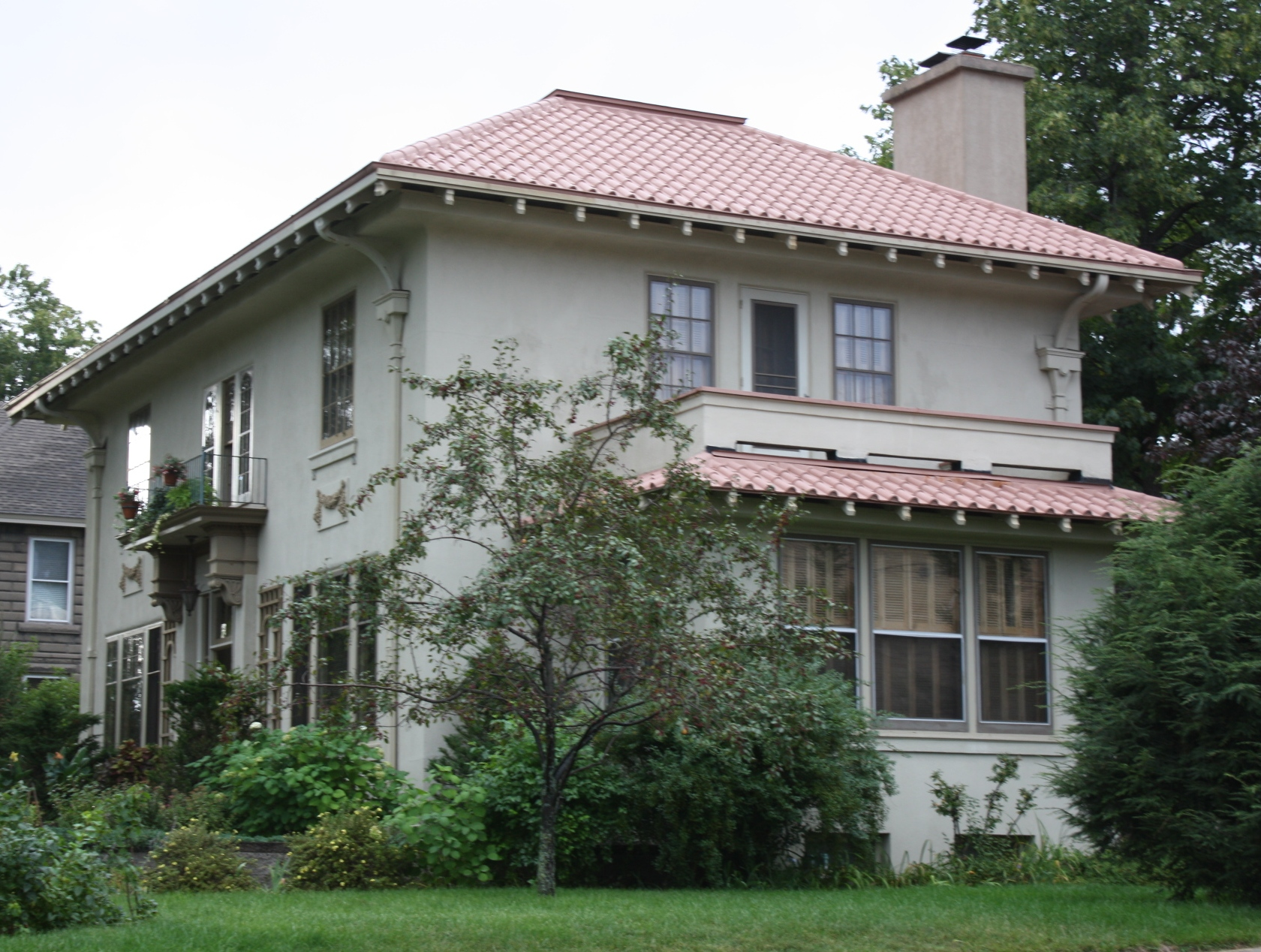

- Location within Wisconsin Location within the United States
- Location: 306 Dahl St. Rhinelander, Wisconsin
- Coordinates: 45.63812°N 89.40655°W
- Area: less than one acre
- Built: 1923
- Architect: Hans T. Liebert
- Architectural style: Italian Renaissance Revival
- NRHP reference No.: 09000821
- Added to NRHP: October 7, 2009

The Solon and Mathilda Sutliff House is a historic house located at 306 Dahl Street in Rhinelander, Wisconsin. It was added to the National Register of Historic Places on October 7, 2009.

== History ==
It is a 2 1/2-story, stucco, Italian Renaissance variant of the Mediterranean Revival style. The house belonged to Solon and Mathilda Sutliff. Solon Sutliff was a native of Newaygo, Michigan.
