= Hazelhurst, Wisconsin =

- Town
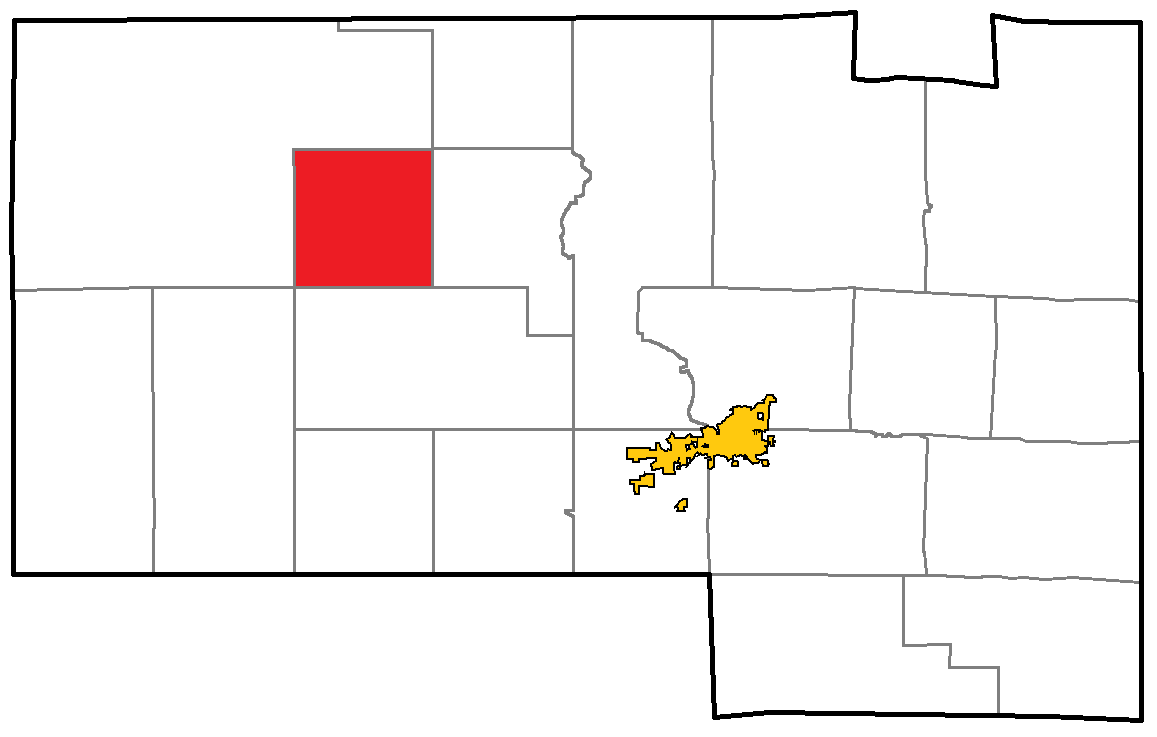
- Location of Hazelhurst, within Oneida County
- Coordinates: 45°47′4″N 89°44′23″W
- Country: United States
- State: Wisconsin
- County: Oneida

Area
  - Total: 35.1 sq mi (90.8 km^{2})
  - Land: 31.2 sq mi (80.8 km^{2})
  - Water: 3.9 sq mi (10.0 km^{2})
- Elevation: 1,598 ft (487 m)

Population (2020)
  - Total: 1,299
  - Density: 41.6/sq mi (16.1/km^{2})
- Time zone: UTC-6 (Central (CST))
  - Summer (DST): UTC-5 (CDT)
- Area codes: 715 & 534
- FIPS code: 55-33575
- GNIS feature ID: 1583374
- Website: http://www.hazelwi.net/

Hazelhurst is a town in Oneida County, Wisconsin, United States. The population was 1,299 at the 2020 census. The unincorporated community of Hazelhurst is located in the town.

Hazelhurst describes itself as the "Quiet side of the North Woods."

== History ==
The Hazelhurst area is part of the traditional homelands of the Ojibwe people, who retained treaty rights to hunt, fish, and gather in the region following nineteenth-century agreements with the United States.

=== Lumber industry ===
The community of Hazelhurst developed around the lumber industry in the late nineteenth century. In 1888, lumbermen William Clyman Yawkey, Cyrus Carpenter Yawkey, and George E. Lee acquired land near Lake Katherine and established a sawmill settlement. Their Yawkey and Lee Lumber Company began cutting timber during the winter of 1888–1889. The growing settlement included workers' residences, a boarding house, a general store, a post office, a church, and a school.

Hazelhurst was named by Alice Yawkey, wife of Cyrus C. Yawkey, for the hazel bushes that grew throughout the area.

The company became the Yawkey Lumber Company in 1893. In 1896, the Hazelhurst and Southeastern Railway Company was incorporated to transport timber and connect the settlement with regional railroads. At its peak, the railroad operated approximately 400 railcars and 13 locomotives.

=== Transition to tourism ===
As the supply of commercially valuable timber declined in the early twentieth century, Hazelhurst increasingly developed as a resort and vacation community. Improved railroad access attracted visitors to the area's lakes for fishing and recreation. During the 1910s and 1920s, resorts and summer homes were developed along Lake Katherine and other nearby lakes, contributing to the transition from logging to tourism.

=== Yawkey Forest Reserve ===
In 2018, the Northwoods Land Trust received a donation of approximately 431 acres of former Yawkey family land near Lake Katherine for conservation. The resulting Yawkey Forest Reserve subsequently expanded to 453 acres, protecting more than four miles of shoreline. The preserve includes recovering forests, wetlands, and remnants of the historic lumber company's railroad infrastructure.

== Geography ==
According to the United States Census Bureau, the town has a total area of 35.0 square miles (90.8 km^{2}), of which 31.2 square miles (80.8 km^{2}) is land and 3.9 square miles (10.0 km^{2}) (11.04%) is water.

Hazelhurst is located on US Route 51, south of State Highway 70. It is located on the west side of Lake Katherine.

== Demographics ==
At the 2000 census there were 1,267 people, 528 households, and 415 families in the town. The population density was 40.6 people per square mile (15.7/km^{2}). There were 1,113 housing units at an average density of 35.7 per square mile (13.8/km^{2}). The racial makeup of the town was 98.03% White, 0.08% African American, 0.32% Native American, 0.32% Asian, 0.16% Pacific Islander, 0.79% from other races, and 0.32% from two or more races. Hispanic or Latino of any race were 0.79%.

Of the 528 households 26.7% had children under the age of 18 living with them, 72.2% were married couples living together, 4.2% had a female householder with no husband present, and 21.4% were non-families. 17.6% of households were one person and 6.4% were one person aged 65 or older. The average household size was 2.40 and the average family size was 2.70.

The age distribution was 21.0% under the age of 18, 4.5% from 18 to 24, 23.2% from 25 to 44, 33.6% from 45 to 64, and 17.7% 65 or older. The median age was 46 years. For every 100 females, there were 105.0 males. For every 100 females age 18 and over, there were 104.3 males.

The median household income was $45,461 and the median family income was $51,579. Males had a median income of $36,833 versus $24,167 for females. The per capita income for the town was $28,732. About 2.2% of families and 3.8% of the population were below the poverty line, including 9.9% of those under age 18 and none of those age 65 or over.

== Transportation ==
The Rhinelander–Oneida County Airport (KRHI) serves Hazelhurst, the county and surrounding communities with both scheduled commercial jet service and general aviation services.

== Notable people ==
- Ed Sparr (1898–1974), football player
- Tom Tiffany (born 1957), member of the Wisconsin State Assembly and State Senate, and US House of Representatives
- William H. Yawkey (1875–1919), owner of the Detroit Tigers, maintained a summer home in Hazelhurst, the boathouse of which is listed on the National Register of Historic Places
