= Bill Yawkey =

American business executive and baseball team owner

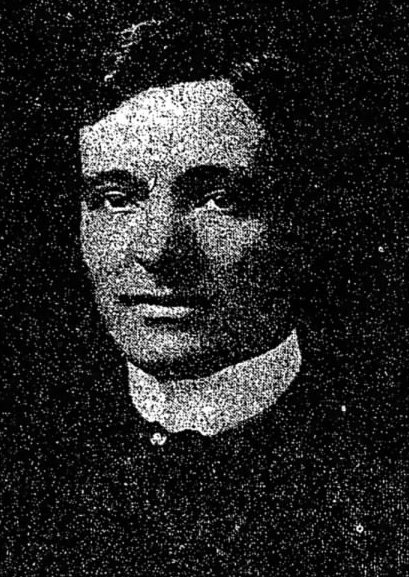
- Born: August 22, 1875; Bay City, Michigan, U.S.
- Died: March 5, 1919 (aged 43); Augusta, Georgia, U.S.
- Occupations: Business executive in lumber and mining; Owner of the Detroit Tigers (1904–1919)
- Family: Tom Yawkey (nephew)

William Hoover Yawkey (August 22, 1875 – March 5, 1919) was an American business executive in the lumber and mining industries. He was the sole owner of the Detroit Tigers of the American League from 1903 through 1908, and majority owner from 1908 to 1919.

== Biography ==
Yawkey was the son of wealthy Michigan lumber tycoon William Clyman Yawkey. The elder Yawkey agreed to buy the Tigers from Samuel F. Angus in 1903, but died before the deal closed. Frank Navin, then the Tigers' bookkeeper and vice president, persuaded the younger Yawkey to complete the deal.

Yawkey took little interest in the Tigers, leaving day-to-day control in Navin's hands. In 1908, Yawkey sold almost half of the club's stock to Navin, effectively making Navin a full partner. Yawkey died in Augusta, Georgia, in 1919 from the Spanish flu. He was interred in a family lot in Brattleboro, Vermont. (Note: Online photos at Find a Grave suggest that he has been re-interred within a Yawkey mausoleum in Woodlawn Cemetery (Bronx, New York).) Following Yawkey's death, Navin bought additional stock from the Yawkey estate, raising his stake to 50 percent; he would remain the Tigers' principal owner until his own death in 1935.

Yawkey left his $40 million estate to his nephew and adoptive son, Tom Yawkey, who later bought the Boston Red Sox.

A boathouse that Yawkey had constructed in 1917 in Hazelhurst, Wisconsin, was added to the National Register of Historic Places in 2009.

A cousin, Cyrus C. Yawkey, owned a lumber business and was a politician in Wisconsin.
