= Lisbon, Iowa =

- City
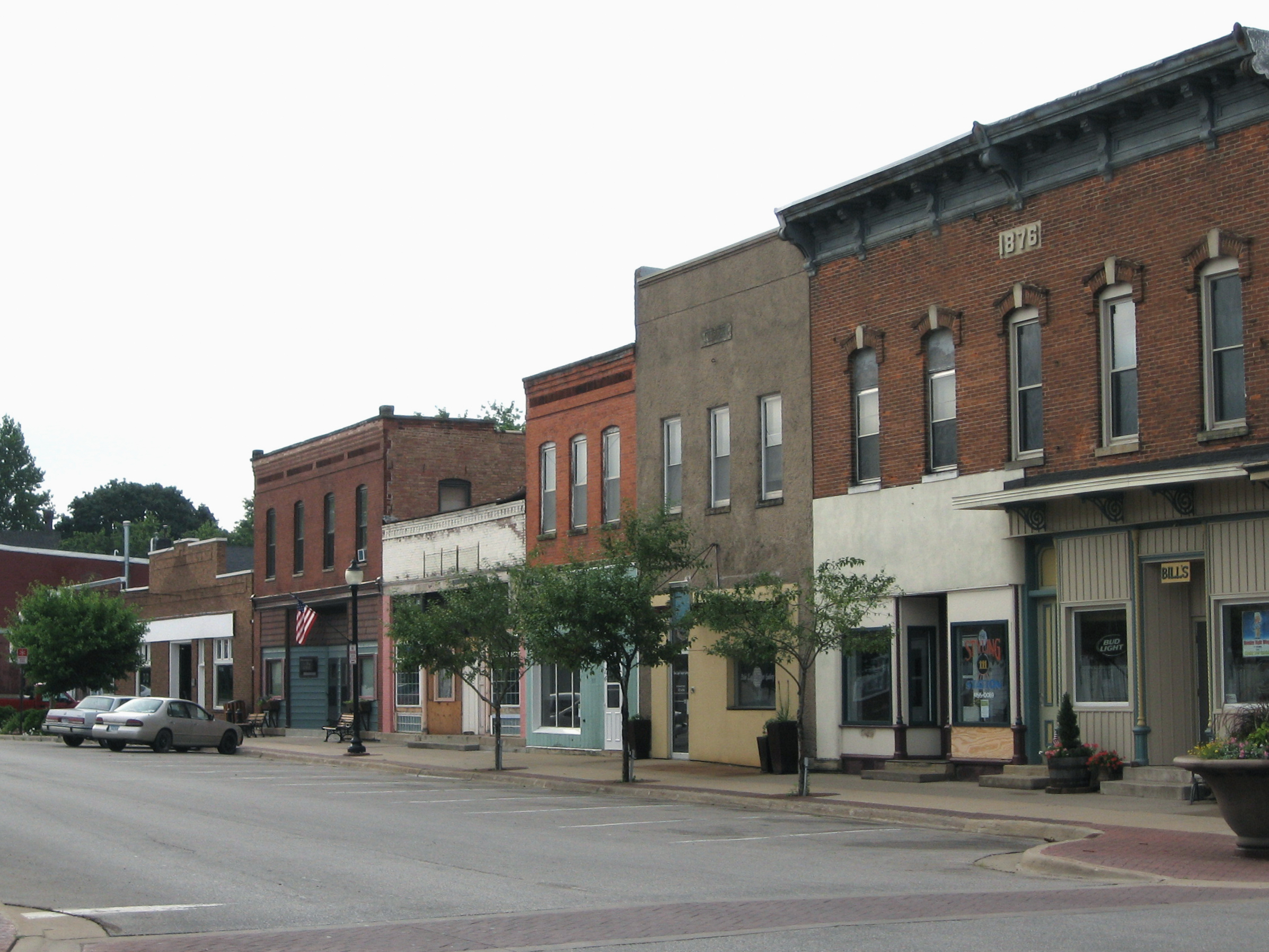
- Downtown Lisbon

- Location of Lisbon, Iowa
- Coordinates: 41°55′14″N 91°23′30″W
- Country: United States
- State: Iowa
- County: Linn

Area
  - Total: 2.13 sq mi (5.51 km^{2})
  - Land: 2.13 sq mi (5.51 km^{2})
  - Water: 0 sq mi (0.00 km^{2})
- Elevation: 840 ft (260 m)

Population (2020)
  - Total: 2,233
  - Density: 1,050.1/sq mi (405.44/km^{2})
- Time zone: UTC-6 (Central (CST))
  - Summer (DST): UTC-5 (CDT)
- ZIP code: 52253
- Area code: 319
- FIPS code: 19-45615
- GNIS feature ID: 2395728
- Website: www.cityoflisbon-ia.gov

Lisbon is a city in Linn County, Iowa, United States, adjacent to the city of Mount Vernon. The population was 2,233 at the time of the 2020 census. It is part of the Cedar Rapids metropolitan area.

== History ==
Lisbon was laid out in 1851. It was named after Lisbon, the capital of Portugal.

== Geography ==
According to the United States Census Bureau, the city has a total area of 2.14 square miles (5.54 km^{2}), all land.

== Demographics ==
Historical populations
Year	Pop.	±%
1860	582	—
1870	662	+13.7%
1880	776	+17.2%
1890	1,079	+39.0%
1900	956	−11.4%
1910	846	−11.5%
1920	803	−5.1%
1930	795	−1.0%
1940	873	+9.8%
1950	952	+9.0%
1960	1,227	+28.9%
1970	1,329	+8.3%
1980	1,458	+9.7%
1990	1,452	−0.4%
2000	1,898	+30.7%
2010	2,152	+13.4%
2020	2,233	+3.8%
Source:"U.S. Census website". United States Census Bureau. and Iowa Data Center; Source: U.S. Decennial Census

=== 2020 census ===
As of the 2020 census, there were 2,233 people, 885 households, and 610 families residing in the city. The population density was 1,050.1 inhabitants per square mile (405.4/km^{2}). There were 922 housing units at an average density of 433.6 per square mile (167.4/km^{2}).

The median age in the city was 40.0 years. 26.1% of residents were under the age of 18, 4.3% were between the ages of 20 and 24, 23.8% were from 25 to 44, 26.0% were from 45 to 64, and 17.7% were 65 years of age or older. For every 100 females there were 96.9 males, and for every 100 females age 18 and over there were 91.8 males age 18 and over. The gender makeup of the city was 49.2% male and 50.8% female.

Of the 885 households, 35.1% had children under the age of 18 living with them, 52.5% were married-couple households, 6.4% were cohabiting-couple households, 24.5% had a female householder with no spouse or partner present, and 16.5% had a male householder with no spouse or partner present. 31.1% of households were non-families, 26.6% of households were made up of individuals, and 11.0% had someone living alone who was 65 years of age or older.

95.8% of residents lived in urban areas, while 4.2% lived in rural areas. There were 922 housing units, of which 4.0% were vacant. The homeowner vacancy rate was 0.0% and the rental vacancy rate was 10.7%.

Racial composition as of the 2020 census
Race	Number	Percent
White	2,131	95.4%
Black or African American	19	0.9%
American Indian and Alaska Native	3	0.1%
Asian	6	0.3%
Native Hawaiian and Other Pacific Islander	0	0.0%
Some other race	18	0.8%
Two or more races	56	2.5%
Hispanic or Latino (of any race)	39	1.7%

=== 2010 census ===
As of the census of 2010, there were 2,152 people, 824 households, and 570 families living in the city. The population density was 1,005.6 inhabitants per square mile (388.3/km^{2}). There were 861 housing units at an average density of 402.3 per square mile (155.3/km^{2}). The racial makeup of the city was 97.8% White, 0.5% African American, 0.2% Native American, 0.1% Asian, 0.1% from other races, and 1.3% from two or more races. Hispanic or Latino of any race were 1.2% of the population.

There were 824 households, of which 40.3% had children under the age of 18 living with them, 55.0% were married couples living together, 9.7% had a female householder with no husband present, 4.5% had a male householder with no wife present, and 30.8% were non-families. 25.1% of all households were made up of individuals, and 9.9% had someone living alone who was 65 years of age or older. The average household size was 2.61 and the average family size was 3.15.

The median age in the city was 36.4 years. 29.2% of residents were under the age of 18; 6.5% were between the ages of 18 and 24; 27% were from 25 to 44; 26.3% were from 45 to 64; and 11.1% were 65 years of age or older. The gender makeup of the city was 48.7% male and 51.3% female.

=== 2000 census ===
As of the census of 2000, there were 1,898 people, 728 households, and 516 families living in the city. The population density was 897.8 inhabitants per square mile (346.6/km^{2}). There were 752 housing units at an average density of 355.7 per square mile (137.3/km^{2}). The racial makeup of the city was 97.58% White, 0.37% African American, 0.32% Native American, 0.11% Asian, 0.11% from other races, and 1.53% from two or more races. Hispanic or Latino of any race were 0.95% of the population.

There were 728 households, out of which 40.9% had children under the age of 18 living with them, 58.9% were married couples living together, 9.1% had a female householder with no husband present, and 29.1% were non-families.

Age spread: 30.1% under the age of 18, 8.1% from 18 to 24, 30.1% from 25 to 44, 21.4% from 45 to 64, and 10.2% who were 65 years of age or older. The median age was 34 years. For every 100 females, there were 100.8 males. For every 100 females age 18 and over, there were 94.4 males.

The median income for a household in the city was $45,139, and the median income for a family was $55,583. Males had a median income of $37,500 versus $24,432 for females. The per capita income for the city was $18,275. About 6.0% of families and 6.8% of the population were below the poverty line, including 8.2% of those under age 18 and 4.7% of those age 65 or over.

== Education ==
The Lisbon Community School District operates local public schools.

== Area attractions ==
- Sutliff Bridge
- Cornell College

== Notable people ==
- Dwayne Andreas, CEO of Archer Daniels Midland and political donor, was raised in Lisbon
- Roger Dolan, racing driver
- David Kaczynski, youth counselor, reform advocate and brother of Theodore Kaczynski. Lived in town in the 1960s.
- Theodore J. Kaczynski, math professor; more notoriously, the Unabomber. Lived seasonally at 307 E. Main Street in the mid-to-late 1960s.
- Bob Kaliban, actor, voice actor, and singer
