= Son of man (disambiguation) =

Son of man is the translation of various Hebrew and Greek phrases used in the Hebrew Bible, various apocalyptic works of the intertestamental period, and in the Greek New Testament.

Son of man may also refer to:

== Religion ==
- Son of man (Christianity), one of the names and titles of Jesus in the New Testament
- Son of man (Judaism), denoting mankind generally in contrast to deity or godhead, with special reference to the human weakness and frailty

== Comics and literature ==
- Son of Man (novel), a 1971 novel by Robert Silverberg
- Son of Man, a 1979 novel by Yi Munyol
- Son of Man, a 2004 collected edition of Hellblazer #129–133
- Hijo de hombre (Son of Man), a 1960 novel by Augusto Roa Bastos
- The Son of Man (book), a 1998 book by Andrew Harvey
- Jesus, the Son of Man, a 1928 book by Kahlil Gibran

== Film and television ==
- Son of Man (1980 film), a 1980 South Korean film directed by Yu Hyun-mok, based on the 1979 novel
- Son of Man (2006 film), a 2006 South African film directed by Mark Anthony Dornford-May
- "Son of Man" (The Wednesday Play), a 1969 television play by Dennis Potter
- A Son of Man, a 2018 Ecuadorian film directed by Jamaicanoproblem

== Music ==
- Son of Man (album), a 2014 album by Hazakim

=== Groups and record labels ===
- Son of Man, an offshoot of Welsh rock band Man
- Sunz of Man, an American hip hop group

=== Choral works ===
- Mab y Dyn (Son of Man), a 1967 choral by Arwel Hughes
- Son of Man, a 1975 choral work by Philip Cannon

=== Songs ===
- "Son of Man" (song), a 1999 song by Phil Collins
- "Son of Man", a song by 10cc from the 2006 album Greatest Hits ... And More

== Other uses ==
- The Son of Man, a 1964 painting by René Magritte

== See also ==
- Manson (disambiguation)
- Månsson (disambiguation)
- Menson (disambiguation)
- Bani Adam (disambiguation) (Persian: بنی‌آدم; Arabic: بني آدم; Hebrew: בן־אדם; lit. 'sons of man')
- Human (disambiguation)
- Human Being (disambiguation)
- Man (disambiguation)
- Men (disambiguation)
- Son (disambiguation)
- Sons of Adam (disambiguation)
