= Mans =

Mans or MANS may refer to:

- Le Mans (Mans), a city in France
  - 24 Hours of Le Mans, a motor race
- Måns, a Swedish given name
- Mans (surname)
- Arrondissement du Mans, an arrondissement of France
- Maharashtra Andhashraddha Nirmoolan Samiti, a skeptic organization in Maharashtra, India
- Mansoura University
- Marine Aerial Navigation School, part of the Marine Aviation Training Support Group 22

== See also ==
- Le Mans (disambiguation)
- Man (disambiguation)
- Men (disambiguation)
- Menson (disambiguation)
- Manson (disambiguation)
- Mansson (disambiguation)
