= Adamson =

Adamson may refer to:

- Adamson (surname), list of people
- Adamson, taxonomic author abbreviation for British botanist Robert Stephen Adamson (1885–1965)
- Adamson (automobile), an English automobile model
- Adamson (comic strip) or Silent Sam, a Swedish comic strip by Oscar Jacobsson
  - Adamson Awards, a Swedish comics award
- Adamson, Kansas
- Adamson, Oklahoma, a ghost town in Pittsburg County, Oklahoma, US
- Adamson University, a university in Manila, Philippines
  - Adamson Soaring Falcons, varsity teams of Adamson University
- W. H. Adamson High School, a high school in Texas, U.S.

== See also ==
- Adamson v. California, a U.S. Supreme Court legal suit
- Adamsen
- Adamsson
- Adams (disambiguation)
- Sons of Adam (disambiguation)
