= Sons of Adam =

Sons of Adam or son of Adam may refer to:

- Cain and Abel, the first and second sons of Adam and Eve
- Seth, the third son of Adam and Eve
- Son of man, or son of Adam, a biblical phrase
- Bani Adam (Persian: بنی‌آدم; Arabic: بني آدم; Hebrew: בן־אדם; lit. 'Sons of Adam'), a Persian poem by Saadi Shirazi
- The Sons of Adam, an American garage rock band
- Sons of Adam, a 1939 play by Beatrix Thomson
- Sons of Adam, a 1945 Egyptian film by Abo El Seoud El Ebiary
- Son of Adam, the Narnian term for a man or boy transported from Earth to Narnia
- Son of Adam, a 1990 memoir by Denis Forman

== See also ==
- Adamsen, a surname
- Adamsson, a surname
- Adamson (disambiguation)
- Bani Adam (disambiguation) (lit. Sons of Adam; Persian: بنی‌آدم; Arabic: بني آدم; Hebrew: בן־אדם; lit. 'sons of Adam')
- Daughters of Eve (disambiguation)
- Son of man (disambiguation)
