= Bani Adam (disambiguation) =

Bani Adam (Persian: بنی‌آدم; Arabic: بني آدم; Hebrew: בן־אדם; lit. 'humans', 'sons of Adam', or 'sons of man') is a poem by Persian poet Saadi Shirazi.

Bani Adam or one of its variations may also refer to:

== Religion ==
- Banu Adam (Arabic: بني آدم, lit. 'son of Adam/man'), an Arabic phrase
- Ben adam (Hebrew: בן־אדם, lit. 'son of Adam/man'), a Hebrew phrase

== Arts and entertainment ==
- "Bani Adam" (Coldplay song), a 2019 song by Coldplay
- Bani Adam, a 2013 Emirati film; see Cinema of the United Arab Emirates
- Al-Bani Adam (Sons of Adam), a 1945 Egyptian film by Abo El Seoud El Ebiary
- El-Bani Adam (The Human Being), a 1945 Egyptian film by Niazi Mostafa
- "Bani Adam", a 1958 Bengali poem by Golam Mostofa
- Bani Adam, a fictional character in the 2018 novel The Lebs
- Ahmad Ali Bani-Adam, Iranian politician and mayor of Shiraz

== See also ==
- Adam (disambiguation)
- Bani (disambiguation)
- Human (disambiguation)
- Human Being (disambiguation)
- Son of man (disambiguation)
- Sons of Adam (disambiguation)
