= Manson (disambiguation) =

Manson is a surname of Scottish origin.

Manson may also refer to:

== Places ==
=== Canada ===
- The Manson River, in the Omineca region of British Columbia
- Mansons Landing, British Columbia, a settlement on Cortes Island, British Columbia
  - Mansons Landing Provincial Park, a park at that settlement
- Manson Creek, British Columbia, a former settlement in the Omineca Region of British Columbia
- Manson Creek (British Columbia), one of three creeks of that name in British Columbia
- Manson, Manitoba

=== United States ===
- Manson, Indiana
- Manson, Iowa
- Manson, Washington
- Manson, Wisconsin, a ghost town

== Other ==
- Manson (film), a 1973 documentary
- Manson Gibson (born 1963), a retired American kickboxer

== See also ==
- Mansson (disambiguation)
- Mansion (disambiguation)
- Menson (disambiguation)
- Munson (disambiguation)
- Monson (disambiguation)
- Son of man (disambiguation)
