= Munson =

Munson may refer to:

== Places ==
- Munson, Florida
- Munson Township, Henry County, Illinois
- Munson, Michigan
- Munson Township, Stearns County, Minnesota
- Munson, New York
- Munson Township, Geauga County, Ohio
- Munson, Pennsylvania
- Munson, Alberta, Canada, a village
- Munsons, Missouri, a community in the United States
- Mount Munson, Ross Dependency, Antarctica

== People ==
- Munson (surname)
- Munson Rufus Hill (1821–1867), American lawyer, politician and Confederate colonel
- Munson Jarvis (1742–1824), merchant and politician in New Brunswick (in what is now Canada)
- Munson Steed, American media executive, publisher, and entrepreneur

== Other uses ==
- Munson (grape)
- Munson Line, an American steamship company from 1899 to 1937
- Munson Medical Center, a referral hospital in Traverse City, Michigan
- Munson Hall, a residence hall on the campus of George Washington University, Washington, DC

== See also ==
- Munson's Hill, Fairfax County, Virginia
- Justice Munson (disambiguation)
- Munsön
- Monson (disambiguation)
- Manson (disambiguation)
