= Woodborough =

Woodborough may refer to two places in England:

- Woodborough, Nottinghamshire
- Woodborough, Wiltshire

== See also ==
- Woodboro, Wisconsin
