= Daughters of Eve =

Daughters of Eve or daughter of Eve may refer to:

- The daughters of Adam and Eve
- Son of man, or daughter of Eve, a biblical phrase
- Daughters of Eve (organisation), a UK-based non-profit organisation that worked to protect girls and young women who were at risk from female genital mutilation
- Daughters of Eve (band), an American garage rock band
- Daughters of Eve (novel), a 1979 novel by Lois Duncan
- Daughter of Eve, a 2000 album by Jill Johnson
- Daughter of Eve, the Narnian term for a woman or girl transported from Earth to Narnia

== See also ==
- Two Daughters of Eve, a 1912 silent film directed by D. W. Griffith
- The Seven Daughters of Eve, a 2001 popular-science book by Bryan Sykes, purporting to establish that most Europeans' ancestry can be traced to just seven mtDNA female-line ancestors
- Sons of Adam (disambiguation)
