= Måns =

Måns is a Swedish male given name that may refer to

- Måns, fictional cat in the Pelle Svanslös children's stories of Gösta Knutsson
  - 8536 Måns, a minor planet named after the cat
- Måns Andersson, 17th century Swedish explorer
- Måns Ekvall (born 1995), Swedish football player
- Måns Forsfjäll (born 2002), Swedish ice hockey defenceman
- Måns Gahrton (born 1961), Swedish author
- Måns Grenhagen (born 1993), Swedish racing driver
- Måns Groundstroem (born 1949), Finnish bass player, studio technician and music producer
- Måns Hedberg (born 1993), Swedish snowboarder
- Måns Herngren (born 1965), Swedish actor and film director
- Måns Mårlind (born 1969), Swedish film director and screenwriter
- Måns Nathanaelson (born 1976), Swedish actor
- Måns Nilsson Kling, 17th century Swedish explorer
- Måns Olström (born 1996), Swedish footballer
- Måns von Rosenstein (1755–1801), Swedish Navy rear admiral
- Måns Olström (born 1996), Swedish football defender
- Måns Saebbö (born 2000), Swedish footballer
- Måns Söderqvist (born 1993), Swedish football forward
- Måns Sörensson (born 1986), Swedish footballer
- Måns Zelmerlöw (born 1986), Swedish pop singer and television presenter

== See also ==
- Mans (surname)
- Magnus
