= Being (disambiguation) =

Being is an extremely broad concept encompassing objective and subjective features of reality and existence.

Being may also refer to:

== Grammar and linguistics ==
- Being, the present participle and gerund form of the English verb to be

== Science and philosophy ==
- Being in itself, a term from 20th-century philosophy
- Category of being, the metaphysical classification of all beings
- Ego (religion), spiritual or religious "beingness"
- Great chain of being, the rationalist classification of all beings
- Reference failure, a concept of Bertrand Russell involving fictional beings
- Sentient beings (Buddhism), a type of being
- Digital being, an artificially intelligent machine

== Arts, entertainment, and media ==
- Being and Nothingness, a 1943 essay on phenomenological ontology by Jean-Paul Sartre
- Being and Time, a 1927 book by Martin Heidegger
- Being (album), 1974 Wigwam album
- Beings (album), a 2015 album by Lanterns on the Lake
- "Being" (Kotoko song)
- "Being" (Lali Esposito song)
- "Being", a song by Opshop, from the album You Are Here
- On Being, a public radio program about religion
- Beings (film), a 1998 British fantasy adventure film
- Being, a 2019 sci-fi drama film starring Lance Henriksen

== Other uses ==
- Being (company), Japanese company
- Energy being, a fictional lifeform
- Liminal being, a fictional lifeform

== See also ==
- Being Human (disambiguation)
- Human Being (disambiguation)
- Supreme Being (disambiguation)
- Ontology, the study of being
- Ousia, Greek for being
