= Supreme Being =

Supreme Being might refer to:

- God, supreme deity in theistic beliefs
- Cult of the Supreme Being, religion established by Robespierre during the French Revolution
- Apeiron, concept in Greek philosophy

== See also ==
- Being (disambiguation)
- Supreme (disambiguation)
- Supreme Beings of Leisure, an American electronic/trip hop band
