= Manson Creek (British Columbia) =

Manson Creek is the name of one of three creeks in British Columbia, Canada. The Manson River in the Omineca Country shared that name until 1951, and is the namesake of the former settlement of Manson Creek, British Columbia. The other creeks are:

- Manson Creek (Nanaimo), a tributary of Boulder Creek southwest of Nanaimo on Vancouver Island
- Manson Creek (Moyie River), a south tributary of the Moyie River southwest of Cranbrook, British Columbia in the East Kootenay region
- Manson Creek (Tyaughton Creek), a north tributary of Tyaughton Creek in the Bridge River Country region west of Lillooet.

== See also ==
- Manson (disambiguation)
