= Sillerud =

Parish in Årjäng Municipality, Sweden

Coordinates: 59°19′N 12°19′E

Sillerud is a parish in Årjäng Municipality, western Värmland, and partly in Dalsland, Sweden, with a population of approximately 110.

It is home to the historic Sillerud Church, originally established in the 13th century, rebuilt several times, and still in use.

== Etymology ==
Sill is the Swedish word for herring and rud/ryd means a small deforested area.

== Notable people ==
- Ture Alfredsson, (1896-1984), reclusive sculptor
- It is believed that Måns Andersson, an ancestor of the Bush family, was from Sillerud, because he named his farm in North America Silleryd. Place names with "-ryd" endings, however, are uncommon in Värmland but more common in South Sweden, particularly in Småland.
