= Woodboro (community), Wisconsin =

Woodboro, Wisconsin
- Unincorporated community
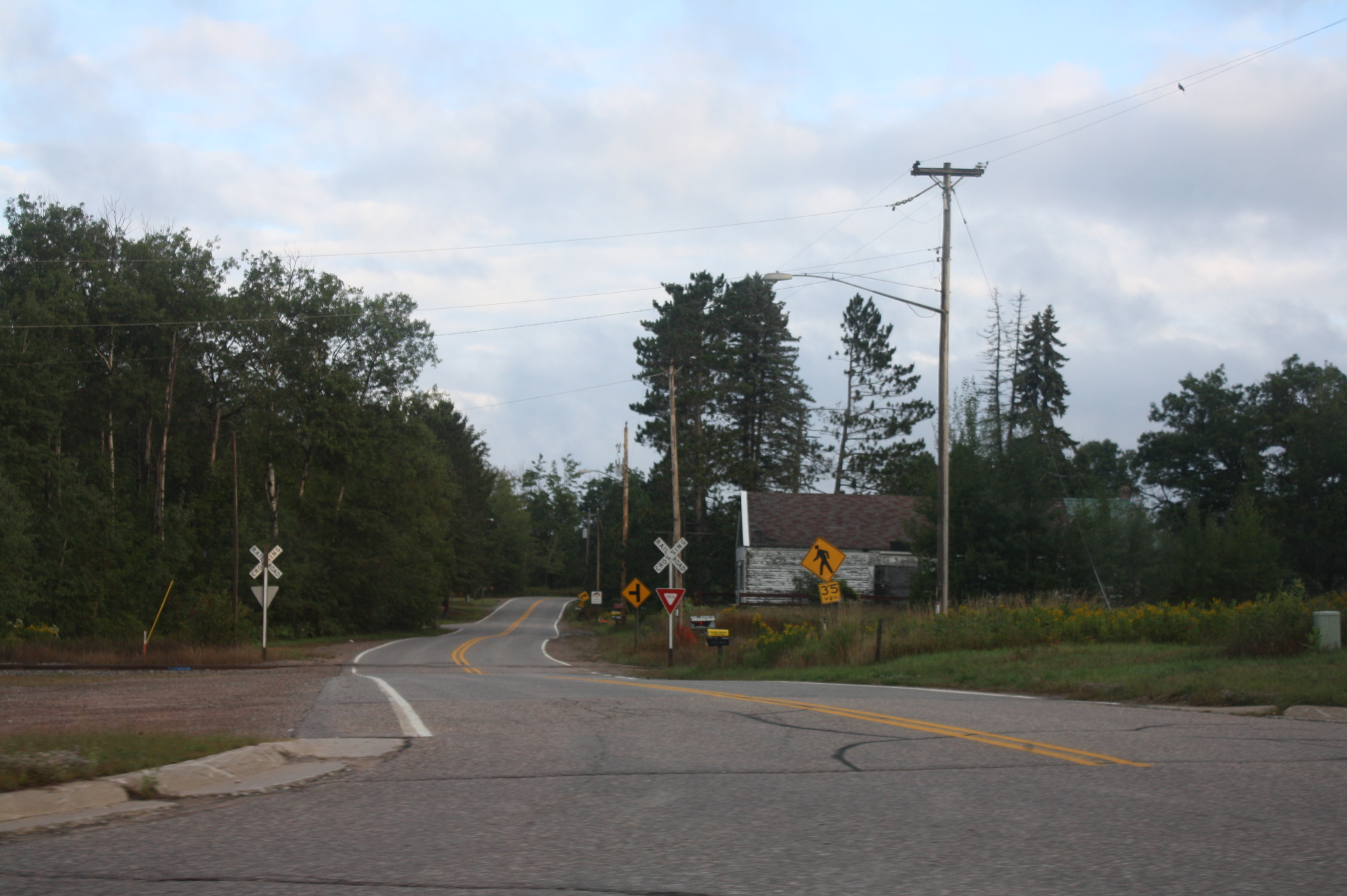
- Looking north at Woodboro

- Location within Wisconsin Location within the United States
- Coordinates: 45°36′27″N 89°33′15″W
- Country: United States
- State: Wisconsin
- County: Oneida
- Elevation: 1,608 ft (490 m)
- Time zone: UTC−6 (Central (CST))
  - Summer (DST): UTC−5 (CDT)
- Area codes: 715 & 534
- GNIS feature ID: 1576981

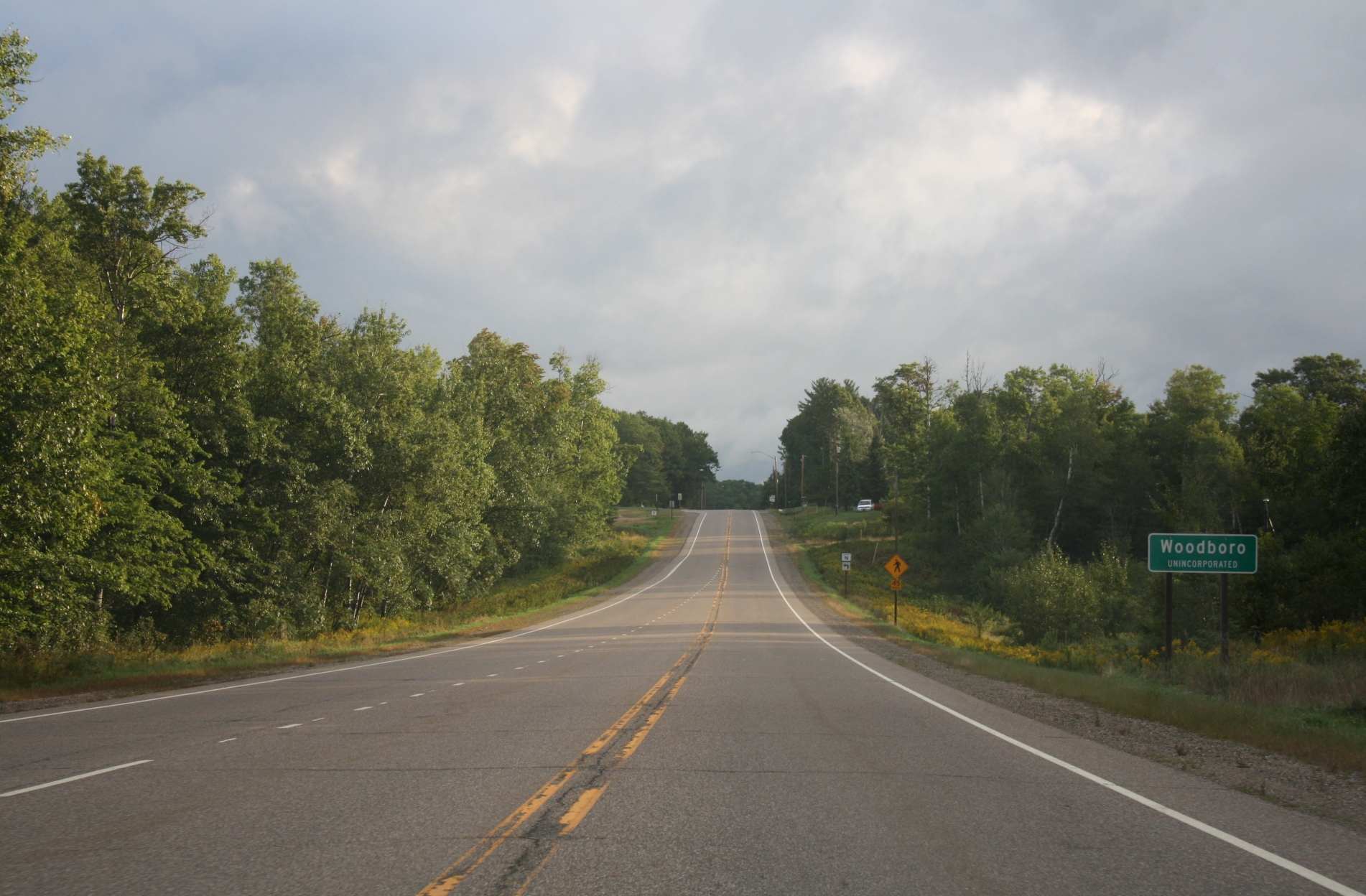
Looking east at the sign for Woodboro on US 8

Woodboro is an unincorporated community located in the town of Woodboro, Oneida County, Wisconsin, United States. Woodboro is located on U.S. Route 8 and the Canadian National Railway, 7 miles (11 km) west-southwest of Rhinelander.
