= Ture i Berg =

Swedish artist and sculptor

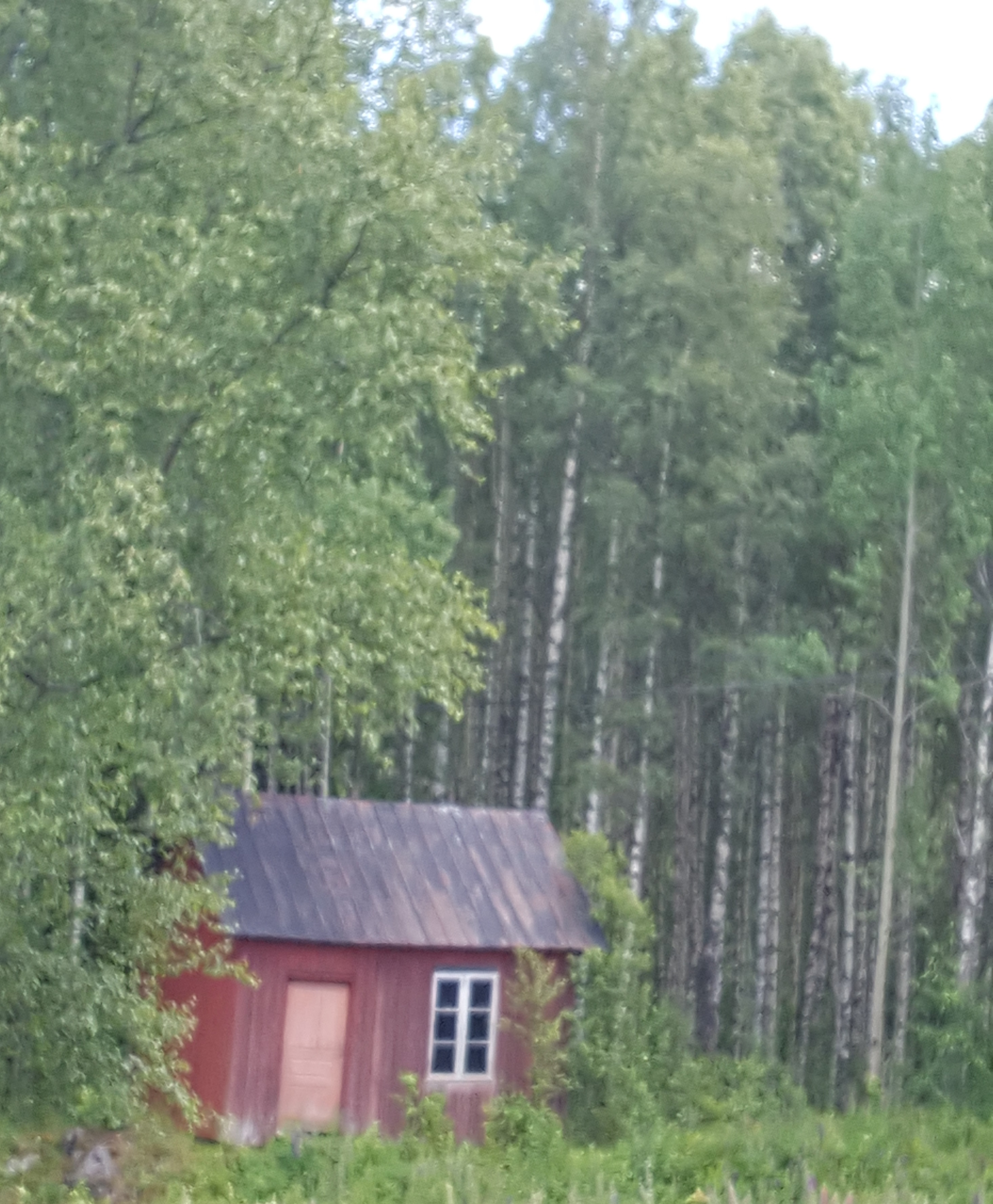
The house where Alfredsson created his art.

Ture Alfredsson (1896–1984) also known as Ture i Berg, was a Swedish artist and sculptor.

== Career ==
Alfredsson had very little contact with the outside world. He lived in a rural area and retired in 1963 at the age of 67.

He only began to take interest in art as a retiree, using the local material he had at his disposal like stones, trash and barbed wire. He felt that art could be made from anything if the artist had a vision. In the small hamlet of Bartveten in Sillerud he built sculptures next to the road passing by his home in the area between Årjäng and Arvika. Alfredsson created his art during a period of roughly ten years, from the mid-1960s.

Alfredsson had difficulty relating to women, and consequently his art depicted a struggle between the sexes. Men and women were rarely displayed together in his pieces; if they were, they were typically involved in some kind of struggle. Alfredsson's view on relationships was one of the many reasons as to why some considered him to be an eccentric.

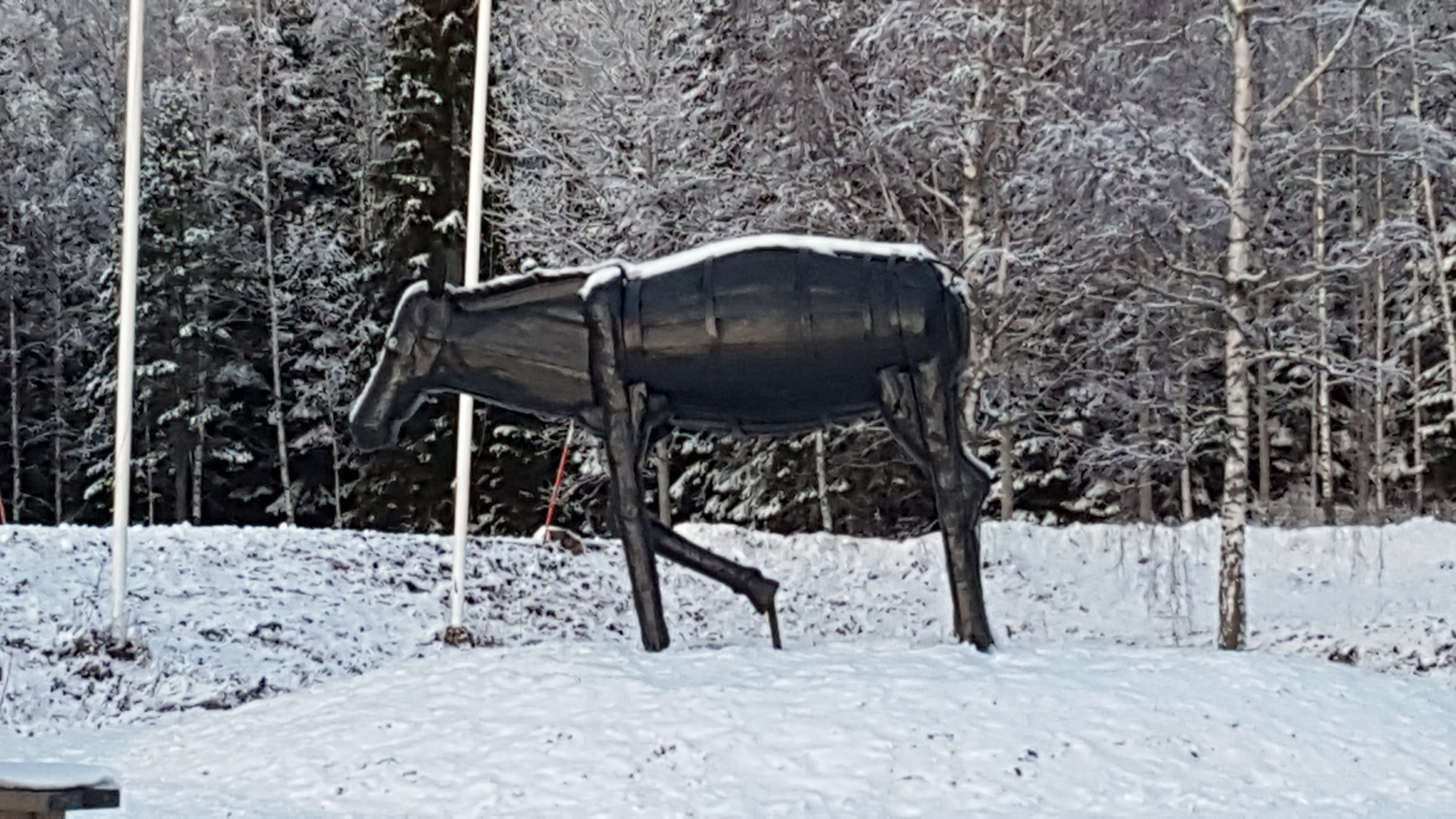
A copy of Ture i Berg's horse Spatte-Roland.

Over the span of his career, Alfredsson created approximately thirty sculptures, all located near where he lived and close to the size of real-life objects. Examples include a group of working farmers, windmills, animals and a coffee table with artificial tulips. Some sculptures were mechanic, almost machines. Alfredsson enjoyed making his sculptures mobile.

Located in the center of his sculpture garden, there was a tower, allowing his work to be viewed from a single vantage point. Most of his sculptures have perished, and many of them are preserved only as photographs.
