= Monson =

Monson may refer to:

== People ==
- Monson (surname)
- Baron Monson
- Monson baronets

== Places ==
=== United States ===
- Monson, California
- Monson, Maine
- Monson, Massachusetts
  - Monson Center, Massachusetts
- Monson Township, Traverse County, Minnesota
- Monson, New Hampshire, a former town
- Monson, West Virginia
- Monson Lake State Park, Minnesota

=== Elsewhere ===
- Mount Monson, Antarctica

== Other uses ==
- Monson Community Church, Monson, Maine, US
- Monson Developmental Center, Monson, Massachusetts, US
- Monson High School, Monson, Massachusetts, US
- Monson Historical Society Museum, Monson, Maine, US
- Monson Lake State Park, Minnesota, US
- Monson Motor Lodge, Saint Augustine, Florida, US, site of civil rights protests in 1964
- Monson Railroad, Maine, US (1883–1943)

== See also ==
- Munson (disambiguation)
- Manson (disambiguation)
