= Sillerud Church =

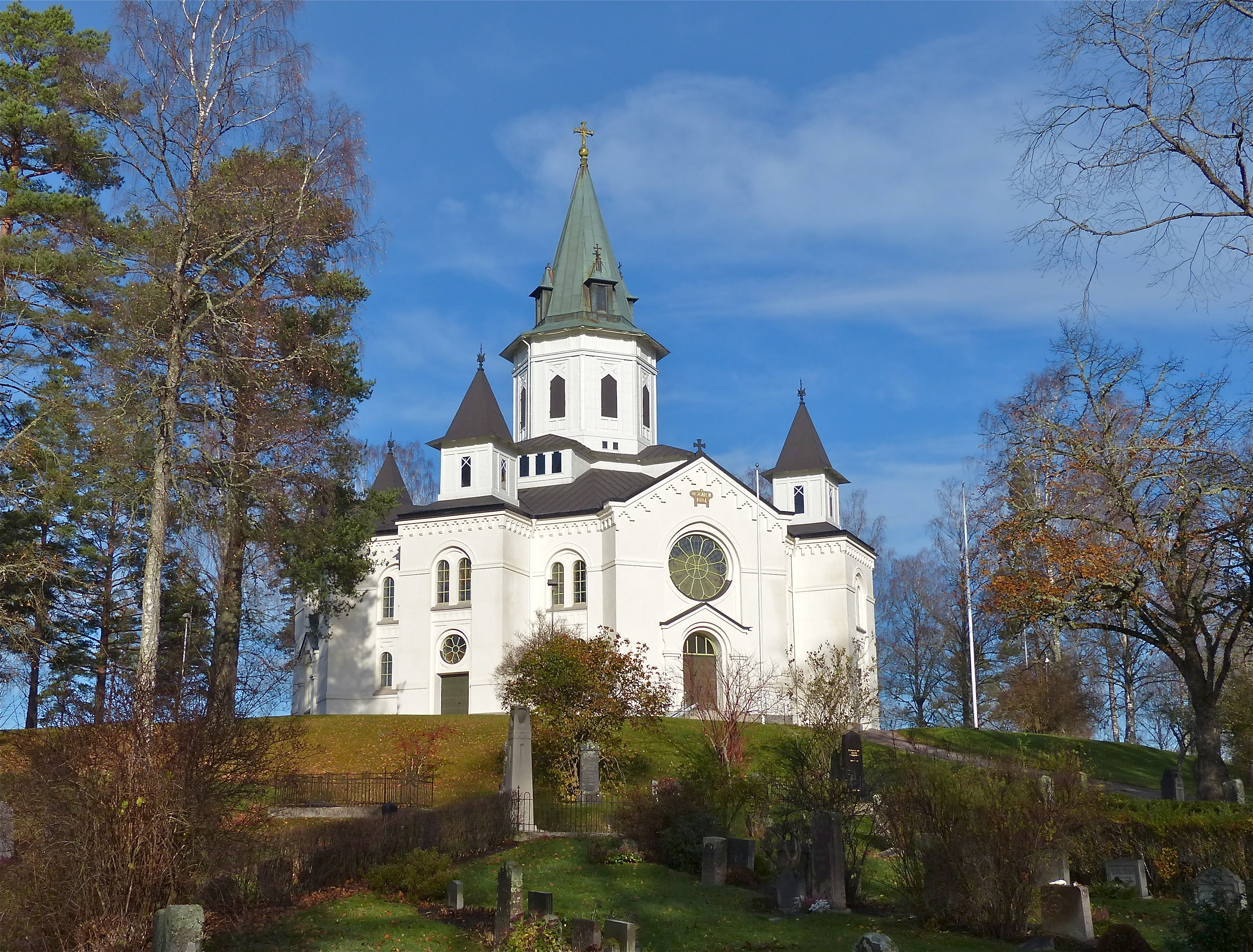
- Sillerud Church
- Country: Sweden
- Religious institute: Church of Sweden

Administration
- Diocese: Karlstad
- Parish: Sillerud parish

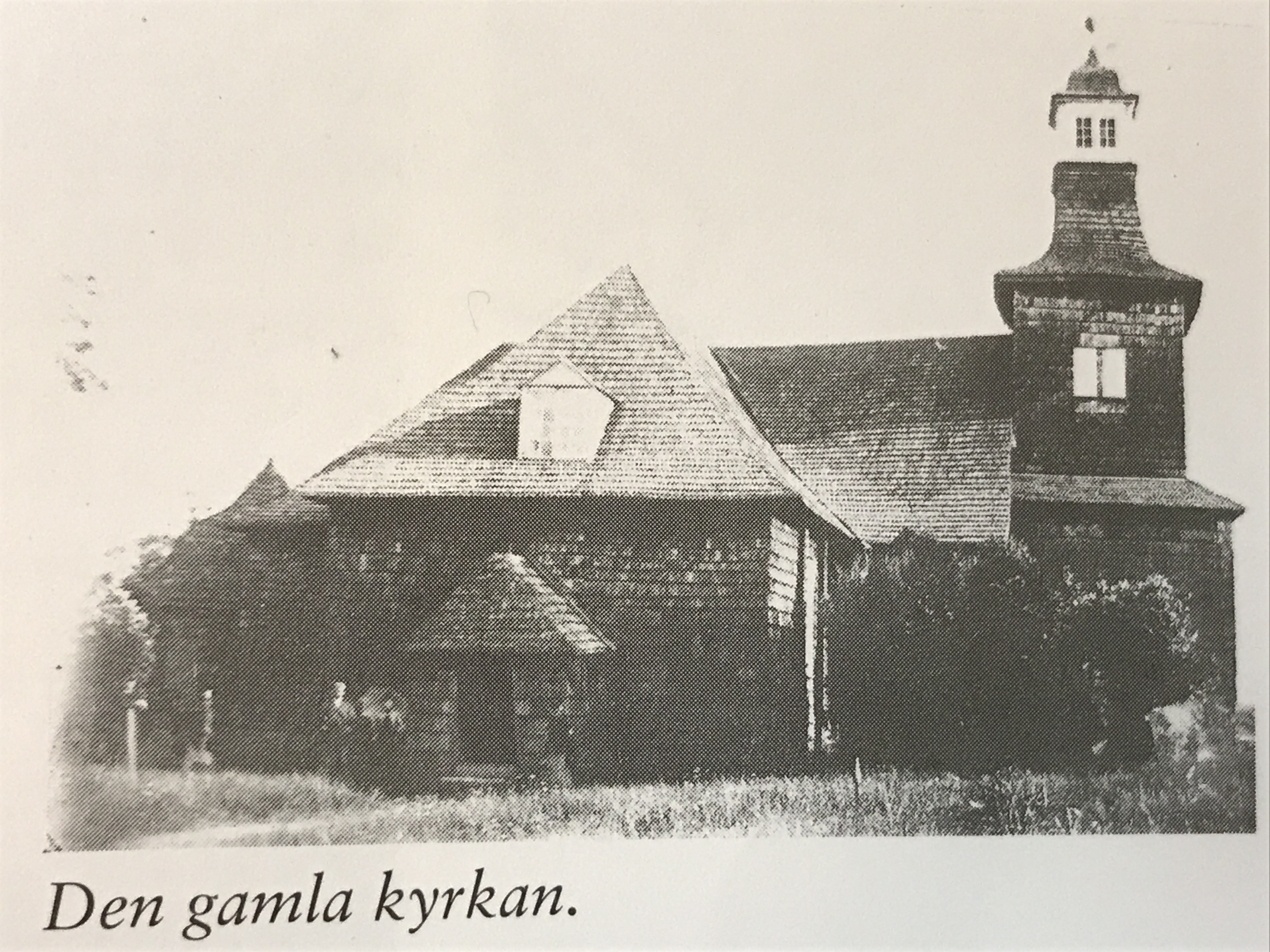
The old church from the late 1800s

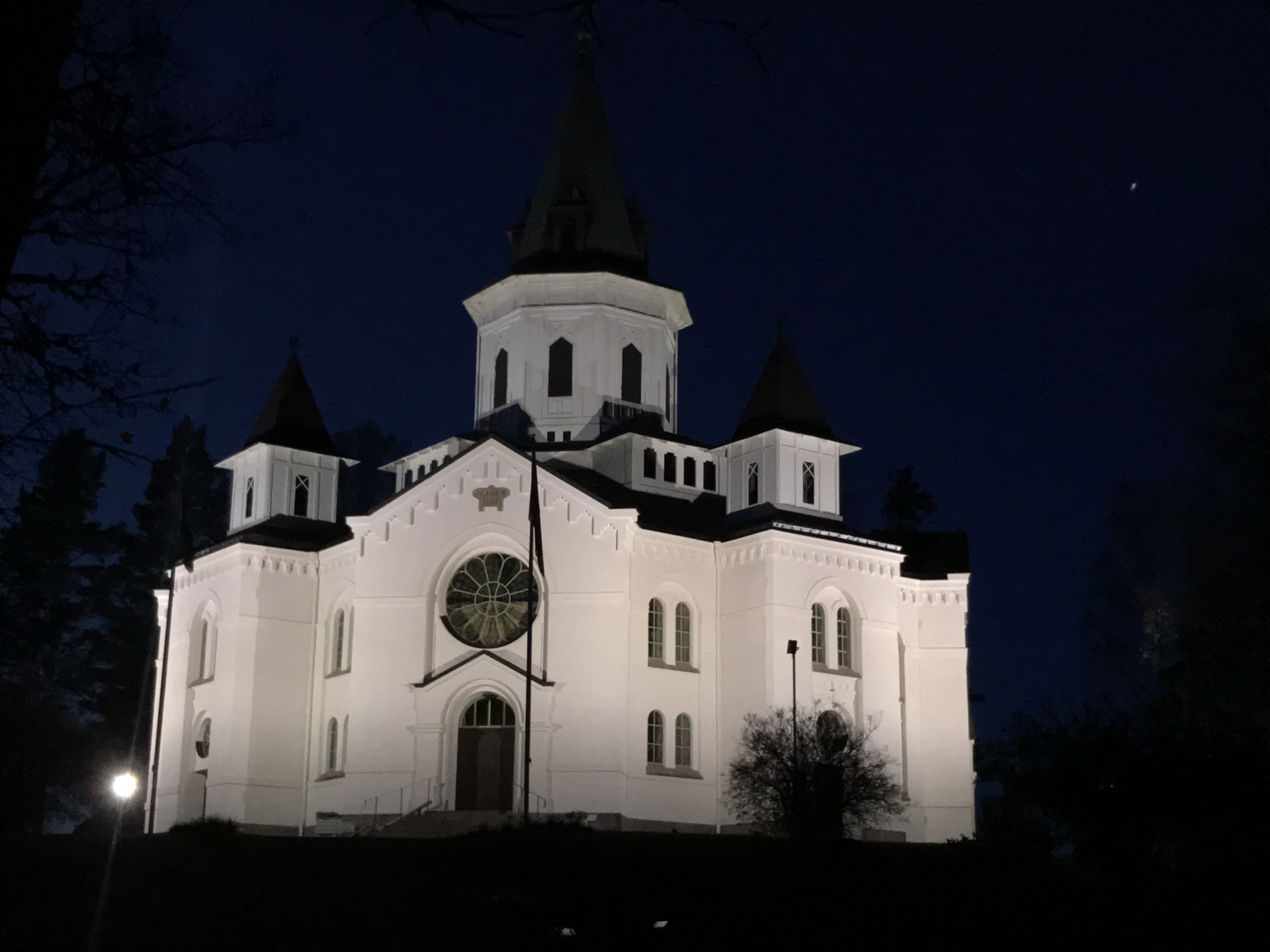
Sillerud Church at night time

Sillerud Church (Swedish: Silleruds Kyrka) is located in Sillerud parish, Årjäng Municipality, Sweden.

== Description ==
The new church, built in the late 1800s, is located 4 kilometres north-northwest of Lake Östra Silen, near the previous located churches which are no longer standing there. The new church is made of stone and is a central church in Sillerud parish, there are also other buildings, connected to religious rituals, that were used before in the same area. Sillerud church is an octagon-shaped building.

== History ==
The first missioners arrived in this area of Sweden in the 1200s from the east. They passed by the area around what is now Sillerud parish. The first church in Sillerud parish must have been built before 1220, according to sources it can even be earlier. Later on, that church was destroyed in a fire. Another church was built in the same place (see the first photo above).

The drawing was made by architect Emil V.Langlet. 32 churches like this were built during this time in Sweden. It was built in 1888, it is the third church to be built in Sillerud parish.

The second church, which was only thought to replace the first church for a limited time period, replaced the original, cruciform church, which burned down in 1662. The second church was a wooden church, it was inaugurated in 1665 and replaced the first church. It was demolished in 1891. The church was already replaced in 1888 by the newest church (see the second photo).

== Contemporary use ==
In the old days, was the assembly handled by voluntary. Nowadays, the church is run by The Swedish Church. Priests are Jenny and Nils Anshelm.

In the church there are occasions like concerts that are held frequently, baptism of children and confirmations. The church is a popular site to get married.
