= Manson Lake =

Lake in Oneida County, Wisconsin

Manson Lake is a 236 acres (96 ha) lake located in Oneida County, Wisconsin with a maximum depth of 54 ft (16 m). The lake is surrounded by forest on the south end and houses and lodges on the north end. On the north end also sits the ghost town of Manson, Wisconsin. U.S. Route 8 also passes Manson Lake.
