= Le Mans (disambiguation) =

Le Mans is a city in France.

Le Mans may also refer to:

== Racing ==
- Circuit de la Sarthe, a race track in the city of Le Mans
- 24 Hours of Le Mans, a sports car endurance race
- 24 Hours of Le Mans (motorcycle race), a motorcycle endurance race
- Petit Le Mans, a sports car endurance race in Georgia, United States
- Le Mans car, a term for sports prototype cars associated with the 24-hour race
- Le Mans Series, a European sports car endurance series (preceded by the European Le Mans Series)
  - American Le Mans Series, an American sports car endurance series
  - Asian Le Mans Series, an Asian sports car endurance series
- Team LeMans, auto parts maker in Shibuya, Tokyo

== Vehicles ==
- Le Mans Prototype, a race car type used in the 24 Hours of Le Mans and the racing series listed above
- Audi Le Mans quattro, a concept car later manufactured as the Audi R8
- Daewoo LeMans, a hatchback and sedan manufactured by Daewoo
- Pontiac LeMans, a car marketed by General Motors
- Moto Guzzi Le Mans, a sports motorcycle

== Video games ==
- Le Mans 24 Hours video games, including:

- LeMans (video game), a 1976 arcade game by Atari
- WEC Le Mans, a 1986 arcade game
- Le Mans 24 (video game), a 1997 arcade game by Sega
- Le Mans 24 Hours (video game), a 1999 game also known as Test Drive Le Mans

== Film ==
- Le Mans (film), a 1971 film directed by Lee H. Katzin
- Ford v Ferrari, titled Le Mans '66 in some countries, a 2019 film directed by James Mangold

== Other sports ==
- Le Mans Sarthe Basket, basketball club in Le Mans, France
- Le Mans Union Club 72, association football club in Le Mans, France

== Other uses ==
- Le Mans (band), a Spanish indie rock band
- Roman Catholic Diocese of Le Mans

== See also ==
- Mans (disambiguation)
