= Son of man (Christianity) =

Expression in the sayings of Jesus in Christian writings

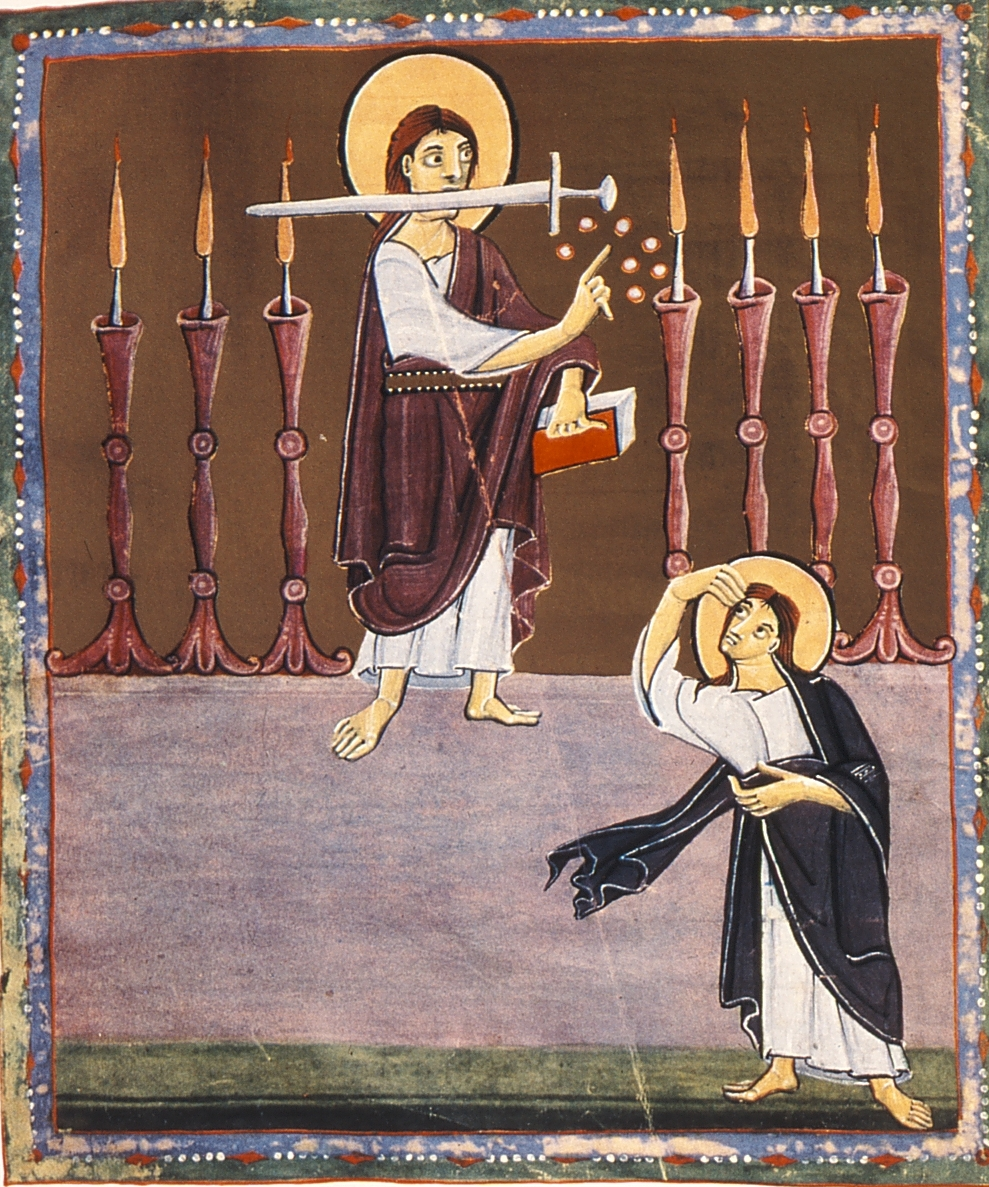
The Son of man with a sword among the seven lampstands, in John's vision. From the Bamberg Apocalypse, 11th century.

Son of man is an expression in the sayings of Jesus in Christian writings, including the Gospels, the Acts of the Apostles and the Book of Revelation. The meaning of the expression is controversial. Interpretation of the use of "the Son of man" in the New Testament has remained challenging and after 150 years of debate no consensus on the issue has emerged among scholars.

The expression "the Son of man" occurs 81 times in the four canonical gospels (mainly quoting Jesus) and another four times in the rest of the New Testament. The equivalent Hebrew expression "son of man" (בן–אדם, i.e. ben-'adam, lit. son of Adam) appears in the Old Testament 103 times.

The use of the definite article in "the Son of man" in the Koine Greek of the Christian gospels is original, and before its use there, no records of its use in any of the surviving Greek documents of antiquity exist. Geza Vermes has stated that the use of "the Son of man" in the Christian gospels is unrelated to usage in the Torah.

At a surface level, the Christological perspective on Son of man ("man" referring to Adam) has been seen as a possible counterpart to that of Son of God and just as Son of God affirms the divinity of Jesus, in a number of cases Son of man affirms his humanity. The profession of Jesus as the Son of God has been an essential element of Christian creeds since the Apostolic age, and while some do not think profession of Christ as Son of man was necessary for Christians, the proclamation of Jesus as the Son of man has been an article of faith in Christianity since at least the Nicene Creed which reads in English as: "by the power of the Holy Spirit he became incarnate from the Virgin Mary, and was made man."

== Etymology and usage ==
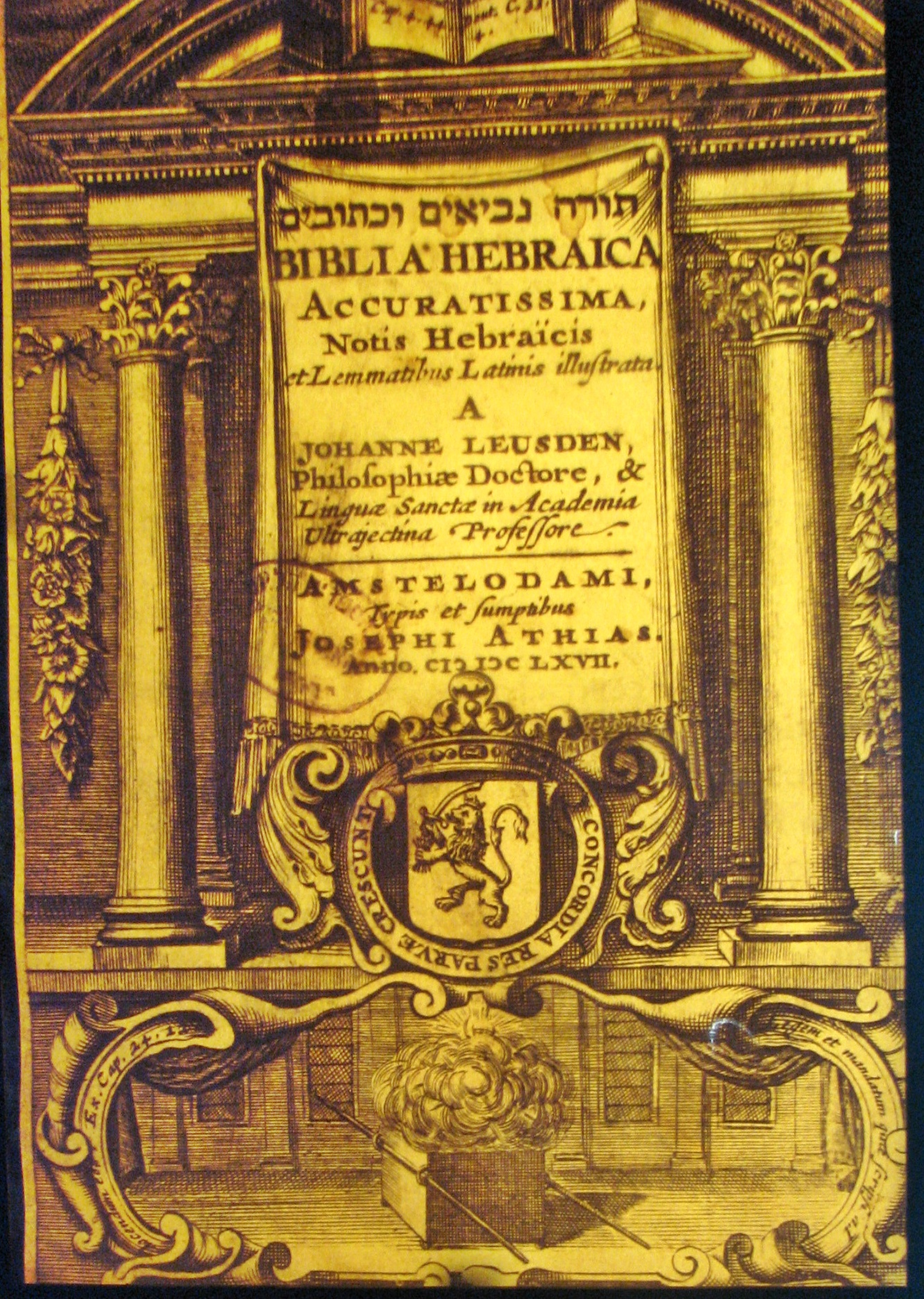
Front page of a 17th-century Hebrew Bible

In the Koine Greek of the New Testament, "the son of man" is "ὁ υἱὸς τοῦ ἀνθρώπου" (ho huios tou anthropou). The Hebrew expression "son of man" (בן–אדם i.e. ben-'adam) also appears over a hundred times in the Hebrew Bible. In thirty-two cases, the phrase appears in intermediate plural form "sons of men", i.e. human beings.

The expression "the Son of man" appears 81 times in the Koine Greek of the four Gospels: 30 times in Matthew, 14 times in Mark, 25 times in Luke and 12 times in John. However, the use of the definite article in "the Son of man" is novel, and before its use in the canonical gospels, there are no records of its use in any of the surviving Greek documents of antiquity.

Geza Vermes has stated that "the son of man" in the New Testament is unrelated to Hebrew Bible usages. Vermes begins with the observation that there is no example of "the" son of man in Hebrew sources and suggests that the term originates in Aramaic – ברנש – bar nash/bar nasha. He concludes that in these sources "Son of man" is a regular expression for man in general and often serves as an indefinite pronoun and in none of the extant texts does "son of man" figure as a title. The NRSV translates it as "mortal" in the Hebrew Bible, the TNIV and the NLT as "mere mortals" in Hebrews 2:6.

However, other sources argue that the Son of Man is a title, claimed by Jesus as a way of asserting his own divine nature. For example, Samuel Whitefield argues that within the biblical context, all humans are referred to as "Sons of Man", or more specifically, sons of Adam. Jesus' claiming this specific title was a direct claim to divine authority, alluding to that of Daniel, the one who is prophesied to "[come] with the clouds of heaven" and who is to be "given authority, glory and sovereign power" As such, though the title itself could refer to any human being, the title itself refers to a specific religious messianic figure. Note that in Greek and Hebrew, the gender for a group that includes male and female individuals must be the masculine. Hence, for example, the NRSV translates the plural υἱοὶ θεοῦ (Matthew 5:9) as "children of God" even if "sons of God" could be a literal translation.

The occurrences of Son of man in the Synoptic gospels are generally categorized into three groups: (i) those that refer to his "coming" (as an exaltation), (ii) those that refer to "suffering" and (iii) those that refer to "now at work" i.e. referring to the earthly life.

The presentation of Son of man in the Gospel of John is somewhat different from the Synoptics: in John 1:51 he is presented as contact with God through "angelic instrumentality", in John 6:26 and 6:53 he provides life through his death, and in John 5:27 he holds the power to judgement.

The translators of the Common English Bible chose to translate the Greek expression and the presumed original Aramaic as "the Human One" or "the human being", considering it an idiom. They also note that ἄνθρωπος refers to both males and females, so they translate it as "human" unless the context makes clear the gender or the English results unnatural.

== New Testament references ==
=== Synoptic gospels ===
In Matthew 8:20 and Luke 9:58 Jesus states: "The foxes have holes, and the birds of the sky have nests, but the Son of man has nowhere to lay his head." This phrasing seems to tie in with the Old Testament prophetic expressions used by such prophets as Ezekiel, and it shows Jesus' understanding of himself as the "man" that God has singled out as a friend and representative.

=== Johannine literature ===
The first chapter of the Book of Revelation refers to "one like a Son of man" in Revelation 1:12-13 which radiantly stands in glory and speaks to the author. In the Gospel of John Jesus is not just a messianic figure, nor a just prophet like Moses, but the key emphasis is on his dual role as Son of God and Son of man.

== Other references ==
=== Book of Moses ===
The title "Son of Man" is used nine times in the Book of Moses, a 19th-century work considered canonical scripture by the Church of Jesus Christ of Latter-day Saints and included in its publication The Pearl of Great Price. According to Nontrinitarianism, Moses 6:57 suggests that a name of God the Father is "Man of Holiness," and that the title "Son of Man" points to Jesus' divine sonship.

=== Book of Daniel ===
The description "son of man" appears in the Book of Daniel, and most sources allude specifically to this particular verse. In Daniel 7, one "like a son of man" is seen. The Aramaic original means "like a human being". He is seen "coming with the clouds of heaven. In the Old Testament, the cloud is the garment or dwelling-place of deity, the symbol of its presence in the midst of the people. Isaiah 19:1 lauds the "Lord riding upon a soft cloud"; at the transfiguration, the cloud was the sign of God's presence on the mountain (Matt 17:5 and parallels); and on the day of his ascension, Jesus was taken up in a cloud. He approached the Ancient of Days and was led into his presence. He was given authority, glory and sovereign power; all nations and peoples of every language worshiped him. His dominion is an everlasting dominion that will not pass away, and his kingdom is one that will never be destroyed." (Daniel 7:13–14)

== Interpretations ==
=== Scholarly views ===
The interpretation of the use of "the Son of man" in the New Testament has proven to be challenging. James D. G. Dunn and separately Delbert Burkett state that it is a prime example of the limits of New Testament interpretation because after 150 years of debate, no consensus on its meaning has emerged. Near the end of the twentieth century, Reginald H. Fuller stated "The problem of the Son of Man is a can of worms. No one can write anything about it which will command general assent or provide a definitive solution".

The earliest approaches, going back to the Fathers of the Church, relied on the Greek expression and interpreted "son" in a parental sense. This approach continued into the Middle Ages. By the time the Protestant Reformation was under way, three new approaches had emerged: one that saw it as an expression of the humanity of Jesus, another that viewed it as a messianic title derived from the Book of Daniel (7.13), and a third which considered it as a general idiom for self-reference. By the 17th century, the first approach (focusing on his humanity) had gained ground, yet by the 19th century the messianic view had increased in popularity.

In the last part of the 20th century, the messianic view was highly criticized and the concept of idiomatic use began to gain support among some scholars. However, no consensus has emerged among scholars on how the expression can be interpreted. Another view put forward by Bart D. Ehrman (1999) is that there are some passages (as such Mark 8:38, 13:26, 14:62; Matthew 19:28, 25:31–46; and Luke 12:8–9) in which Jesus mentions 'the Son of Man' and does not appear to be talking about himself, but about someone else, namely a cosmic judge who would come down from heaven to bring judgment. The identification of the Son of Man with Jesus might thus be a later, inauthentic tradition. Ingolfsland (2001) argued that Ehrman's examples were not valid, or did not meet his own criteria. Likewise, Michael F. Bird argues against Erhman that Jesus did see himself as the Son of Man. Tucker Ferda also finds the idea later Christians invented the connection between Jesus and the son of man or retrojected it into the gospels to be highly unlikely. Dale Allison states that Jesus was distinctive for his self-identification as the son of man, finding efforts to dismiss the connection with Daniel 7 and proposals that Jesus was referring to a figure other than himself to be unsuccessful.

=== Jewish views ===
In Judaism, "son of man" denotes mankind generally, in contrast to deity or godhead, with special reference to their weakness and frailty (Job 25:6; Psalms 8:4; Psalms 144:3; Psalms 146:3; Isaiah 51:12, etc.) or the term "ben adam" is but a formal substitute for the personal pronoun.

=== In Christology ===
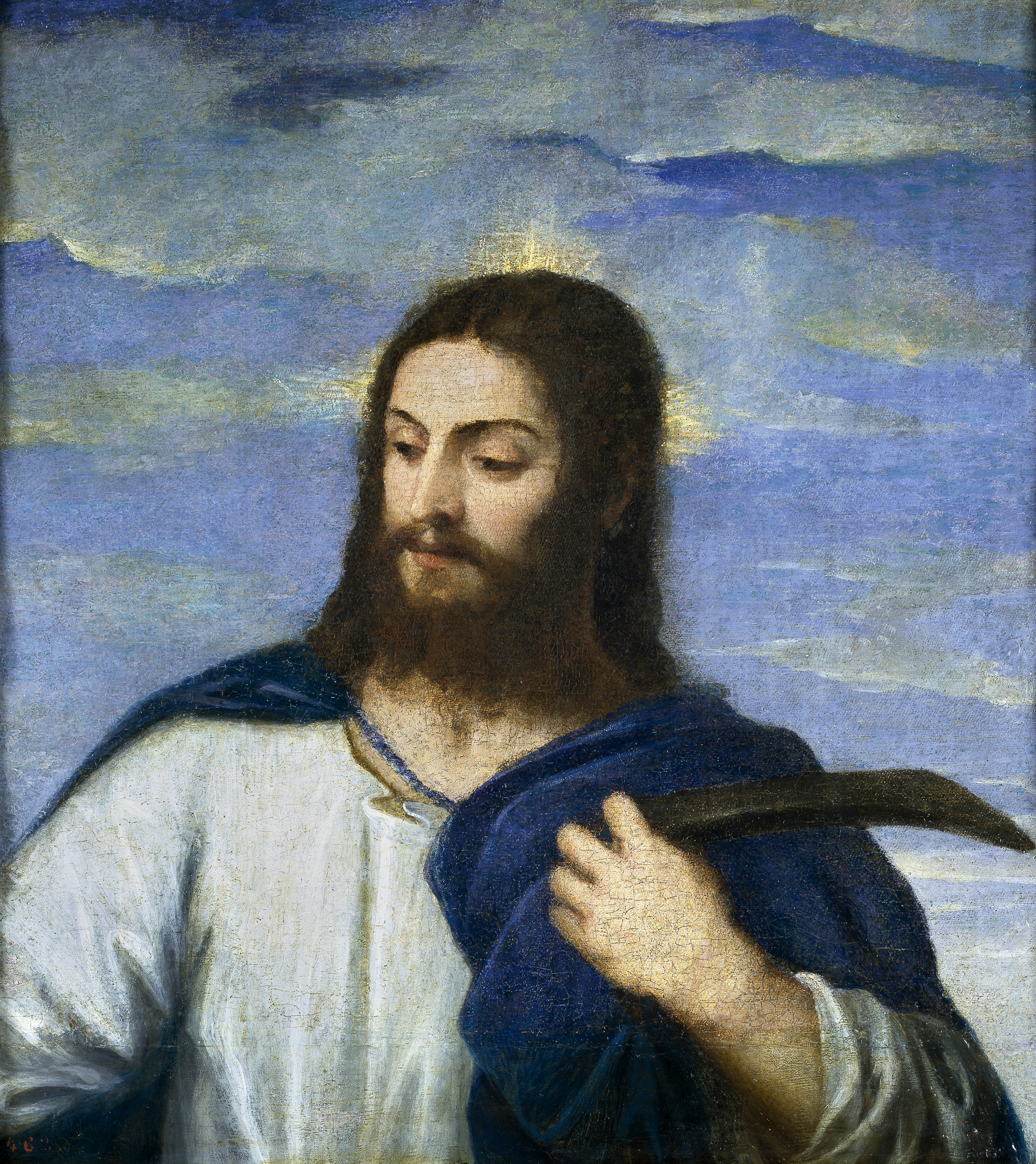
Christ, by Titian – (detail) 1553, oil on canvas, 68x62cm, Prado Museum Madrid.

Sixty-nine times in the Synoptic Gospels, Jesus calls himself (the) "Son of man", a Greek expression which in its Aramaic (and Hebrew) background could be an oblique way of indicating the speaker's own self (e.g., Matt 8:20), or else simply mean "someone" or "a human being" (as in Ps 8:4, where it is a poetic variant for "man"). In Daniel 7:13–14 the "Son of man" seems to symbolize the angels (perhaps the archangel Michael) and/or the righteous and persecuted Jews who will be vindicated and given authority by God (Dan 7:18,21–22,27; 10:13, 21; 12:1) rather than function as one individual, heavenly figure who represents the people. What is clear from the evidence is that "Son of man" did not function in pre-Christian messianic expectations as a title for a deliverer expected to come in the last times. But to the Israelites and other readers and followers of the Torah this phrase would have meaning and point to the Messiah. It was not even a sharply defined concept, with a specific content and reference. It could simply denote a member of the human race (Ps. 8:4) or be a way of pointing to a prophet's insignificance and finite dependence in the face of God's glory and infinite power. Therefore, God addresses Ezekiel ninety-three times as "son of man".

==== Three contexts ====
According to the Synoptic Gospels, Jesus referred to himself as "Son of man" in three contexts, each with its own circle of fairly distinct meanings. He used this self-designation of (1) his earthly work and its (frequently) humble condition (e.g., Mark 2:10, 28 parr.; Matt 11:19=Luke 7:34; Matt 8:20=Luke 9:58); (2) his coming suffering, death, and resurrection (Mark 9:9,12; Mark 14:21 and, above all, Mark 8:31; 9:31; 10:33–34 parr.); (3) his future coming in heavenly glory to act with sovereign power at a final judgement (e.g., Mark 8:38; 13:26–27 parr.; Matt 24:27=Luke 17:24; Matt 25:31–32; see John 5:27). These classifications show how the "Son of man" served as a way of indicating Jesus' importance and even universal relevance. This was especially true of the class (3) sayings. In other words, "Son of man" was used to say what Jesus did rather than what he was. It was not and did not become a title in the normal sense—at least not on the lips of Jesus himself.

At the same time, the evangelists (and/or their sources) do not always seem to distinguish "Son of man" sharply from "Christ/Messiah" or "Son of God". For Mark, the Davidic Messiah and Daniel's Son of man are one and the same person, and their name is Jesus. In Mark 14:61-62, the reply that Jesus makes to the high priest's question ("Are you the Messiah, the Son of the Blessed One?") conveys some glorious connotations of "the Son of God" as a figure who will come in triumph on the clouds of heaven to judge his enemies: "I am; and you will see the Son of man seated at the right hand of the Power, and coming with the clouds of heaven". In John's Gospel, the expression gains a significant element not found in the Synoptic Gospels under any of the three meanings listed above: the "Son of man" is a personally pre-existent figure (e.g., John 3:13; John 6:62).

==== Jesus' ministry ====
Regarding Jesus himself, much debate originated in deciding whether any or all of the three classes of self-referential sayings derived from what he said in his ministry. A few scholars have even attempted to prove that none of the "Son of man" sayings came from Jesus himself. However, there remain good and convergent reasons for maintaining that, while there was some editorial reworking, Jesus did speak of himself as "Son of man", filled the term with his own meanings, and was responsible for the three classes of "Son of man" sayings listed above. Along with the way he used the image of the kingdom of God and that of God as Father, here a third classic example is supplied of Jesus taking an inherited expression and using it massively but in his own way.

First, one does not find others ever describing, addressing, or confessing Jesus as the Son of man apart from four marginal cases (Acts 7:56; Rev. 1:13; 14:14; Heb. 2:6). The last three cases deal with quotations from the Old Testament. In the Gospels, other people address and speak about Jesus in a variety of ways, but never directly as "Son of man". According to John 12:34, the audience of Jesus were puzzled when he referred to himself as "the Son of man". Now, if the early Church had freely created the Son of man sayings, it would be puzzling that this designation for Jesus is not found on the lips of others. The puzzle disappears once it is agreed that there is here a genuine historical recollection: only Jesus used the term, and the evangelists and their sources faithfully recorded that.

Second, the Son of man sayings in which Jesus refers to his (often humble and merciful) earthly activity are attested by both Mark (e.g., Mark 2:10, 28) and Q source (Matt 8:20=Luke 9:58; Matt 11:19=Luke 7:34). The sayings dealing with the coming or apocalyptic Son of man likewise turn up in Mark (Mark 8:38; 13:26; 14:62) and in Q (e.g., Matt 24:27=Luke 17:24). This double strand of tradition or multiple attestation can encourage one to attribute to Jesus at least class (1) and class (3) of the Son of man sayings.

Third, there was some Jewish background to Jesus' Son of man sayings, but there was scarcely any follow-up in the emerging Church. Later on, the Church Fathers would use the term as a way of referring to Christ's humanity as opposed to his divinity or to his being the Son of God. However, in the first century the designation does not seem to have been useful in preaching the good news. It does not appear in credal and liturgical formulas. It was too flexible and even vague: it ranges from the mysterious heavenly being of Daniel 7 to simply serving as a circumlocution for "I". Linguistically, it was a particularly odd expression for Greek-speaking people. The fact that the designation was strange and unsuitable for the early Church's life and ministry suggests that the Son of man sayings did not derive from groups in the Church, but from another source, which could only really be Jesus.

Fourth, the sayings about the coming Son of man sometimes imply a certain differentiation between this figure and Jesus. Therefore, Luke reports Jesus as declaring: "Every one who acknowledges me before men, the Son of man also will acknowledge before the angels of God" (Luke 12:8). Matthew modifies this Q saying to read: "Every one who acknowledges me before men, I also will acknowledge before my Father who is in heaven" (Matt. 10:32). Apparently, Luke has preserved the original form of the saying, which indicates a certain unity of function between Jesus himself and the Son of man, but at the same time introduces some differentiation between the two figures. The differentiation makes sense once it is recognised that it recalls a turn of phrase actually used by Jesus to distinguish his present preaching from his future judging. The distinction had its point in the historical context of his ministry, but not later in the post-Easter situation where believers acknowledged the personal unity between the risen Jesus and the Son of man who would come in glory. Matthew's modification reflects precisely that shift.

Fifth, there are some unusual features about the preservation of the "Son of man" sayings. The three classes are not blended together. Thus (2) the passion predictions about the Son of man do not go beyond the death and resurrection to include (3) statements about the future coming of the Son of man. Furthermore, the sayings about God's kingdom (and, specifically, the parables) never introduce the Son of man. The absence of a clear and strong connection between the Son of man and the divine kingdom is puzzling. After all, Daniel 7 was relevant for the functions of the Son of man, and the Danielic imagery had included God's kingdom (Daniel 2:44; 4:3; 7:27). The independence of the three classes of Son of man sayings and the separation of the kingdom sayings from the Son of man can be explained if one sees the Gospels (and the traditions behind them) accurately preserving here distinctions that genuinely went back to Jesus' actual preaching and teaching.

== Comparison to Son of God ==
Researchers often see Son of man and Son of God as contrasting titles. Originally, these designations were understood in light of Christ's two natures: Son of man expressed Jesus' humanity, while Son of God expressed his divinity. Later scholarship then reversed that evaluation. The title "Son of God" is bestowed on other historical figures like Jacob and Solomon; but the Son of man title is claimed only by Jesus. Son of God came to be recognized as a human being, while Son of man, contrary to intuition, was understood as a heavenly being, alluding to the One mentioned in Daniel 7.

Of all the Christological titles used in the New Testament, Son of God has had one of the most lasting impacts in Christian history and has become part of the profession of faith by many Christians, the proclamation of Son of man has never been an article of faith in Christianity. Thus in the mainstream popular context it is the Son of God title which implies the full divinity of Jesus as part of the Holy Trinity of Father, Son and the Spirit.

In the 5th century, Saint Augustine wrote at length on the Son of God and its relationship with the Son of man, positioning the two issues in terms of the dual nature of Jesus as both divine and human in terms of the hypostatic union. He wrote:

Christ Jesus, the Son of God, is God and Man: God before all worlds, man in our world... But since he is the only Son of God, by nature and not by grace, he became also the Son of Man that he might be full of grace as well.

Although Son of man is a distinct concept from Son of God, some gospel passages may seem to equate them in some cases, e.g. in Mark 14:61, during the Sanhedrin trial of Jesus when the high priest asked Jesus: "Are you the Messiah, the Son of the Blessed one?" Jesus responded "I am: and you shall see the Son of man sitting at the right hand of Power, and coming with the clouds of heaven." This seems to build on the statement in Mark 9:31 that "The Son of man is delivered up into the hands of men, and they shall kill him; and when he is killed, after three days he shall rise again." In the parable of the Sheep and the Goats, the returning Son of man has the power to judge, by separating men from "all the nations" into distinct groups, in Matthew 25:31–46. However, James Dunn has pointed out that there is no overall scholarly agreement on these issues, and the Christological debates have continued for well over a century without the emergence of consensus.

Christ being a man-God was so important that it was the major issue addressed at the Council of Chalcedon where the heresy of monophysitism was addressed. Monophysites regarded Christ as having a single nature that was a co-mingling of the two, God and Man, whereas the Orthodox Catholic position held that he was completely God, and completely man, simultaneously. These positions in the Creed of the Nicene council, and the primary subject of the Chalcedonian, shows the importance of early Christian belief in the nature of Jesus as both God and Man, so much so that believing the two could be reduced to a third, intermingled, nature was considered heresy.

== See also ==
- Son of man
- Son of man (Judaism)
- God the Son
- Names and titles of Jesus in the New Testament

== Bibliography ==
- Barker, Margaret. "The Son of Man", in The Lost Prophet: The Book of Enoch and Its Influence on Christianity, London: Sheffield Phoenix Press, 2005.
- Borgen, Peder. Early Christianity and Hellenistic Judaism, Edinburgh: T & T Clark Publishing. 1996.
- Brown, Raymond. An Introduction to the New Testament, New York: Doubleday. 1997.
- Buth, Randall. "A More Complete Semitic Background for bar-enasha 'Son of Man'", in Craig A. Evans and James A. Sanders, eds. The Function of Scripture in Early Jewish and Christian Tradition (JSNT Suppl 154) Sheffield Academic Press, 1998: 176–189.
- Dunn, J. D. G., Christology in the Making, London: SCM Press. 1989.
- Ferguson, Everett. Backgrounds in Early Christianity. Grand Rapids: Eerdmans Publishing. 1993.
- Fischel, Henry A. (ed.). Essays in Greco-Roman and Related Talmudic Literature, New York: KTAV Publishing House. 1977.
- Greene, Colin J. D. Christology in Cultural Perspective: Marking Out the Horizons. Grand Rapids: InterVarsity Press. Eerdmans Publishing. 2003.
- Holt, Bradley P. Thirsty for God: A Brief History of Christian Spirituality. Minneapolis: Fortress Press. 2005.
- Josephus, Flavius. Complete Works. trans. and ed. by William Whiston. Grand Rapids: Kregel Publishing. 1960.
- Letham, Robert. The Work of Christ. Downers Grove: InterVarsity Press. 1993.
- Macleod, Donald. The Person of Christ. Downers Grove: InterVarsity Press. 1998.
- McGrath, Alister. Historical Theology: An Introduction to the History of Christian Thought. Oxford: Blackwell Publishing. 1998.
- Neusner, Jacob. From Politics to Piety: The Emergence of Pharisaic Judaism. Providence, R. I.: Brown University. 1973.
- Norris, Richard A. Jr. The Christological Controversy. Philadelphia: Fortress Press. 1980.
- O'Collins, Gerald. Christology: A Biblical, Historical, and Systematic Study of Jesus. Oxford:Oxford University Press. 2009.
- Pelikan, Jaroslav. Development of Christian Doctrine: Some Historical Prolegomena. London: Yale University Press. 1969.
- _______ The Emergence of the Catholic Tradition (100-600). Chicago: University of Chicago Press. 1971.
- Poulton, Paul. Genesis for Ordinary People. Resource Publications; 2nd ed. 2017.
- Schweitzer, Albert. Quest of the Historical Jesus: A Critical Study of the Progress from Reimarus to Wrede. trans. by W. Montgomery. London: A & C Black. 1931.
- Tyson, John R. Invitation to Christian Spirituality: An Ecumenical Anthology. New York: Oxford University Press. 1999.
- Wilson, R. Mcl. Gnosis and the New Testament. Philadelphia: Fortress Press. 1968.
- Witherington, Ben III. The Jesus Quest: The Third Search for the Jew of Nazareth. Downers Grove: InterVarsity Press. 1995.
- _______ "The Gospel of John." in The Dictionary of Jesus and the Gospels. ed. by Joel Greene, Scot McKnight and I. Howard
