= Judge Munson =

Judge Munson may refer to:

- Alex R. Munson (born 1941), judge of the United States District Court for the Northern Mariana Islands
- Howard G. Munson (1924–2008), judge of the United States District Court for the Northern District of New York

== See also ==
- Justice Munson (disambiguation)
