= Måns Andersson =

Swedish-born pioneer and tobacco farmer (1599–1679)

- Born: c. 1599; Undenäs, Sweden
- Died: c. December 1679 (aged 79–80); Baltimore County (now Cecil County), Colony of Maryland, English America
- Occupations: Pioneer; laborer; planter; landowner; tobacco farmer; tobacco inspector; freeman

Måns Andersson (c. 1599 – c. December 1679) was a Swedish-born pioneer and landowner in the Swedish-American colony of New Sweden and later in Maryland. Arriving in North America abroad the Kalmar Nyckel in 1639 as a company laborer, he transitioned into an tobacco farmer and inspector, and independent freeman.

== Biography ==
During October 1639, Måns Andersson left Gothenburg on the ship Kalmar Nyckel heading to New Sweden. He had been hired as a laborer at the rate of 50 Dutch guilders per year. He, his wife, and one daughter, Britta, arrived in New Sweden in April 1640. When a tobacco plantation was established at Upland (now Chester, Pennsylvania) in 1644, Andersson became a tobacco farmer.

After the death of his first wife, Måns Andersson married a daughter of Christopher Rettel, about 1646. They established their own farm, named Silleryd in present Delaware County, possibly named after the village Sillerud in Värmland. That same year he became a freeman, leaving the employ of the Swedish South Company. Like the other settlers, he was prohibited from trade with native Indians, and forced to do business at unfavorable rates with the company store or Governor Printz's private warehouse. By March 1648 he had accumulated 160 guilders of debt.

Måns Andersson was one of the 22 freemen submitting a complaint to the governor on 27 July 1653, protesting the dictatorial rule and asking for more freedoms. Printz termed this petition a "mutiny" and threatened severe reprisals. For his own safety, Måns Andersson fled New Sweden for the new Dutch colony founded in 1651 near Fort Casimir, known as Swanwick (Swan Cove). But he had not escaped Swedish rule. In May 1654 in a bloodless coup, a new Governor sent from Sweden, Johan Risingh took Fort Casimir. Risingh, however, was a less dictatorial governor, and bought Silleryd from Andersson on 10 July 1654. In September 1655, Fort Casimir was retaken by the Dutch and Andersson signed an oath of allegiance to Governor Stuyvesant with his mark. Anderson was appointed inspector of tobacco in 1656 and remained at Swanwick until 1661, when he immigrated to Maryland to a 150-acre (0.61 km^{2}) plantation named "Mountsfield" near the mouth of the Elk River on Sassafras Neck in Baltimore County (now in Cecil County).

Andersson is last mentioned in the diary of a Dutch traveler, Jasper Danckaerts, who wrote, on 4 December 1679, that "towards evening we came to a Swede's named Mouns, where we had to be put across a creek, where we spent the night with him, and were entirely welcome. He and his wife and some of his children spoke good Dutch and conversed with us about various matters concerning the country."

Finnish author and emigrant researcher K-G Olin claims that there is circumstantial evidence that Måns Andersson in fact was a Finn. At the time of his emigration from Sweden there were many Finns living in Värmland in Sweden. No conclusive evidence of Måns Andersson's place of birth have been found so far.

== Other sources ==
- Louhi, E.A. The Delaware Finns, or The First Permanent Settlements In Pennsylvania, Delaware, West New Jersey And Eastern Part of Maryland. (New York : The Humanity Press. 1925)
- Benson, Adolph B. and Naboth Hedin, eds. Swedes in America, 1638-1938 (The Swedish American Tercentenary Association. New Haven, CT: Yale University Press. 1938) ISBN 978-0-8383-0326-9
