= Bani Adam (Emirati film) =

- Directed by: Majeed Abdulrazak
- Written by: Majeed Abdulrazak
- Produced by: Majeed Abdulrazak
- Starring: Hassan Youssef; Ali Al Tamimi; Alaa Shaker; Abdullah Abdulaziz
- Music by: Fattouh Radhi
- Release date: 2013
- Running time: 139 minutes
- Country: UAE
- Language: Arabic
- Budget: 3 million dirhams

Bani Adam is a 2013 Emirati drama film, written and directed by Majeed Abdulrazak and produced by M A Films.

== Plot ==
The film revolves around a web of complex and intertwined relationships involving three main characters: Sultan, a wealthy man haunted childhood guilt, Salem, who comes from a modest background and Khalil, who is responsible for Sultan’s wealth.

The conflict intensifies as Sultan seeks to Marry his daughter, Maitha to Khalil. However, the emotional landscape is further complicated when Sultan falls in love with a woman named Maha, while both Maha and Maitha find themselves in love with Salem. this tangled web of affections paves the way for all kinds of intrigue and schemes from Khalil’s side, ultimately leading to many surprises and tragic conclusion.

== Cast ==
- Hassan Youssef
- Ali Al Tamimi
- Alaa Shaker
- Abdullah Abdulaziz
- Majeed Abdulrazak
- Alia Al Manaai
- Mohammed Ibrahim Farasha
- Wafaa Makki
- Fatima Al Hosan

== Reception and critical response ==
After the premiere in the United Arab Emirates, the film garnered significant attention and varied reactions, including:

- Retirement of Majeed Abdulrazak: the film’s writer, director, producer, and co-star, announced his permanent retirement from the cinematic work, he made this decision due to what he perceived as a lack of local audience support for Emirati cinema, which he consideres the most vital gateway to achieving success.
- Critical criticisms: the film faced several critical critiques regarding the treatment of many events and characters in the film, the critics argued that many plot points were unconvincing, and that certain character arcs lacked realism, such as the character of "Sultan", criticized for exhibiting "naive reactions" that contradicted his persona as a sophisticated and wealthy businessman.
- Narrative plausibility: major events did not seem realistic at all, particularly a scene where Sultan attempts suicide by throwing himself off a high cliff while paralyzed in a wheelchair. Critics found it implausible not only that he survived the fall onto a rocky shore but that the impact miraculously caused him to recover from paralysis, allowing him to walk again. Such plot devices were seen as “underestimating the audience’s intelligence” in an era of global cinematic awareness.
