= Menson =

Menson may refer to:

== People ==
=== Surnamed ===
- Charles Techie-Menson (20th c.), Secretary-General of the Ghana Trades Union Congress
- Sir Charles William Tachie-Menson (20th c.), Ghanaian politician in the 1944 Gold Coast general election
- Colonel C. R. Tachie-Menson (20th c.), Minister for Information (Ghana)
- Ekua Techie Menson, Director of the Ghana Library Authority
- Francis Edward Techie-Menson (20th c.), Ghanaian politician
- James Hackman Tachie-Menson (1928–2014), Ghanaian-American musician, first recognized Master Mariner from Africa
- Kate Tachie-Menson, Ghanaian model
- Michael Menson, British music producer
- Sir Patrick Menson, British medical doctor, who discovered paragonimiasis while on a Christian medical mission to China

=== Given named ===
- Menson Holloway, U.S. American football player selected in the 2001 NFL draft

=== Fictional characters ===
- Alf Menson (Japanese: アルフ・メンソン, romanized: Arufu Menson), a fictional character from the 1989 TV anime Peter Pan: The Animated Series

== Other uses ==
- Menson, a polling district in Cameron Highlands (federal constituency), Malaysia
- Sir Charles Tachie–Menson Lodge No. 8058 Accra, Ghana; a Ghanaian masonic lodge; see Freemasonry in Ghana

== See also ==
- Son of man (disambiguation)
- Mansson (disambiguation)
- Manson (disambiguation)
