= Adamson (automobile) =

Overview
- Manufacturer: R Barton Adamson & Co
- Production: 1912–1925
- Designer: Reginald Barton Adamson

Body and chassis
- Class: Cyclecar
- Body style: Two-seat open

Powertrain
- Engine: See text
- Transmission: 3-speed

Dimensions
- Wheelbase: 102 in (2,600 mm)

Chronology
- Successor: None

The Adamson was an English car manufactured in Enfield, Middlesex, from 1912 to 1925. It was designed by Reginald Barton Adamson at the premises of the family haulage contract business.

== History ==
The first car of 1912 was a small two-seater bullnosed cyclecar and had a 1,099 cc twin-cylinder or 1,074 cc four-cylinder engine made by Alpha of Coventry driving the rear wheels via a three-speed-and-reverse gearbox and a countershaft from which two V-belts went to the rear wheels. The engine could be started from the driving seat using a mechanical linkage. The channel section steel chassis was placed under the axles with suspension by semi-elliptic leaf springs. This arrangement allowed the car to have a low, sporting appearance. In 1914 the option of a larger four-cylinder version was added. A new model was announced in 1916 with 1330 cc four-cylinder engine, but few if any reached the public before car production ceased later that year.

After the war a new company, R. Barton Adamson and Co, was formed and the 1916 four-cylinder car was resurrected with a Coventry-Simplex engine. In 1920 it cost £375, falling to £210 in 1924, but to put the price into perspective, in 1923 the Austin 7 was launched at £165.

== Twin Car ==
The final cars from 1923 were the "Twin-Cars" that were effectively two sidecars side by side with the driver in the off-side and powered by a choice of air- or water-cooled 9-horsepower 1078 cc V twin-cylinder Anzani engines with chain drive mounted between the two passenger units.

Production numbers are not known.

== See also ==
- List of car manufacturers of the United Kingdom
