= Manson, Wisconsin =

- Ghost town
- Location within Wisconsin
- Coordinates: 45°34′00″N 89°39′41″W
- Country: United States
- State: Wisconsin
- County: Oneida
- Elevation: 1,519 ft (463 m)
- GNIS feature ID: 1964305

Manson is a ghost town in Oneida County, Wisconsin, United States. Manson was located on Manson Lake in the town of Woodboro along what is now US 8 and the Canadian National Railway, 3 miles (4.8 km) northeast of Heafford Junction. The town was marked on USGS maps as late as 1939.
