= Mansons Landing =

Coordinates: 50°04′N 124°59′W

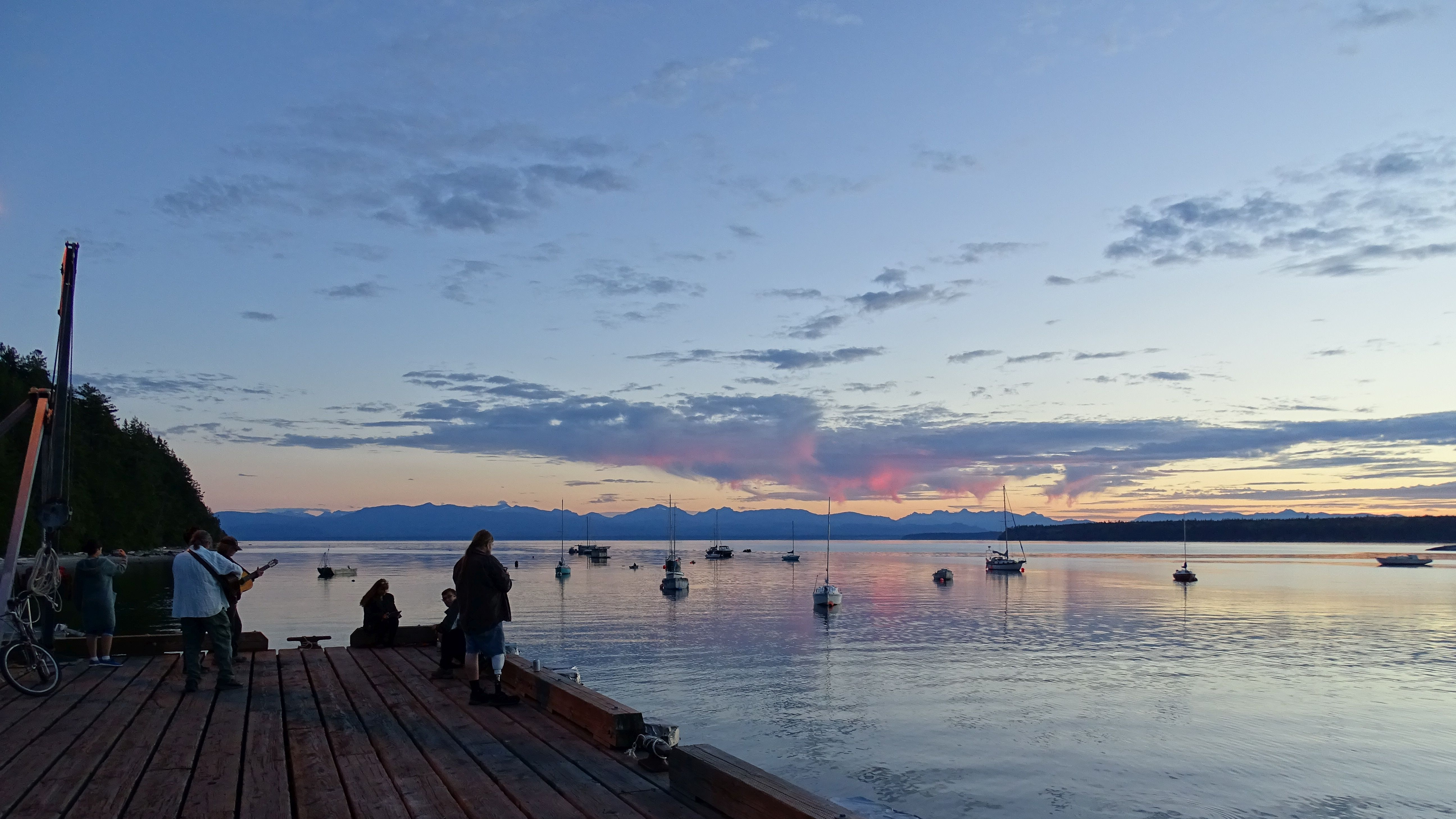
Looking across Sutil Channel from Mansons Landing

Mansons Landing is an unincorporated community near the southern tip of Cortes Island, British Columbia, Canada.

It was originally the location of the Cortez Island Post Office [sic], which opened April 1, 1893 with Michael Manson as postmaster, and closed December 1, 1898. Michael Manson was a Shetland Islander who maintained a trading post along with his brother John from 1887 to 1895. He later represented to Comox riding in Victoria. The post office was re-opened on May 1, 1904. The name was adopted into the provincial gazette as a steamboat landing and settlement on April 6, 1950. The post office had been renamed Mansons Landing Post Office on July 9, 1941.

== See also ==
- Mansons Landing Provincial Park
