= Woodboro, Wisconsin =

- Town
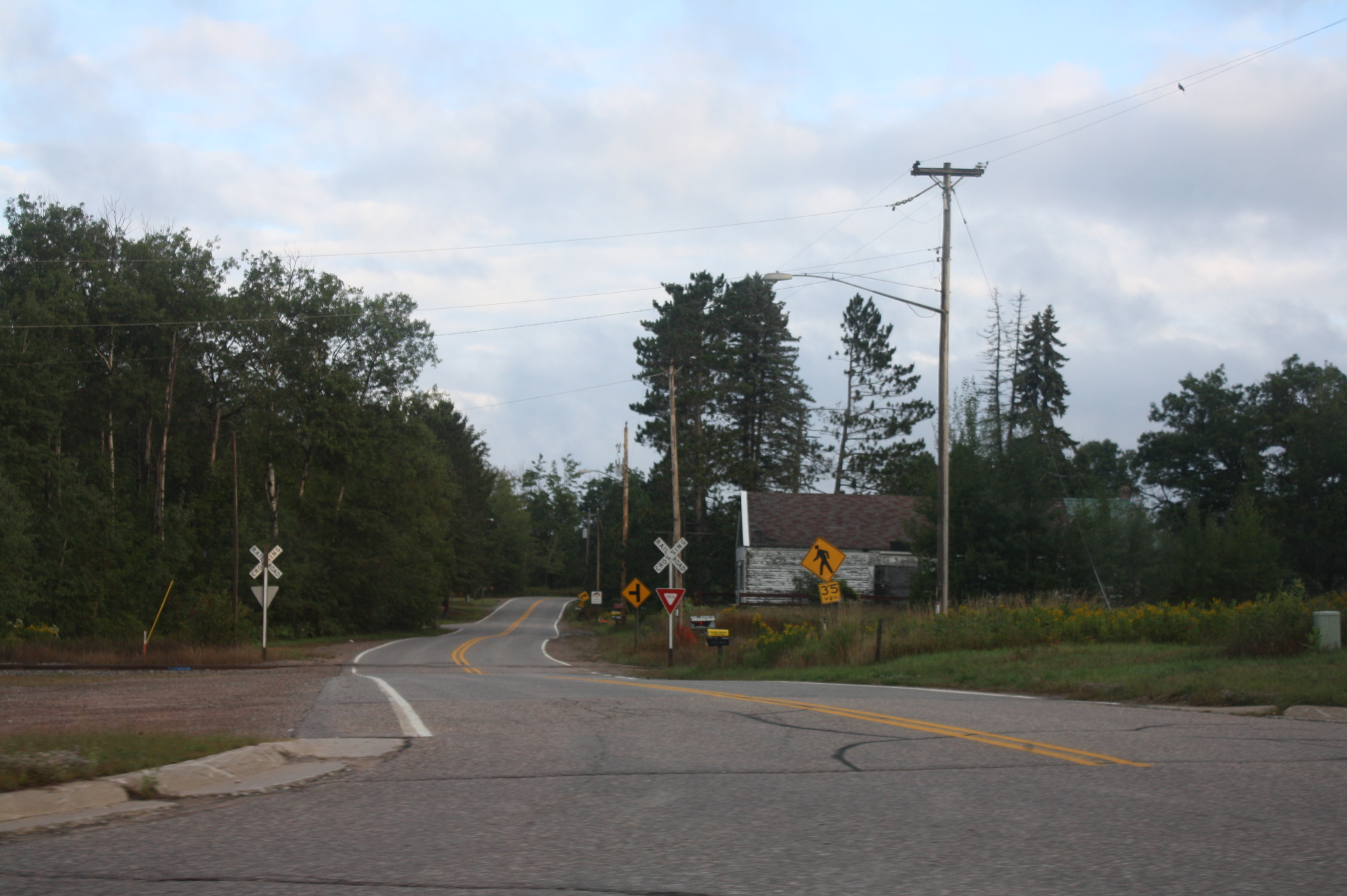
- The unincorporated community of Woodboro in the town of Woodboro

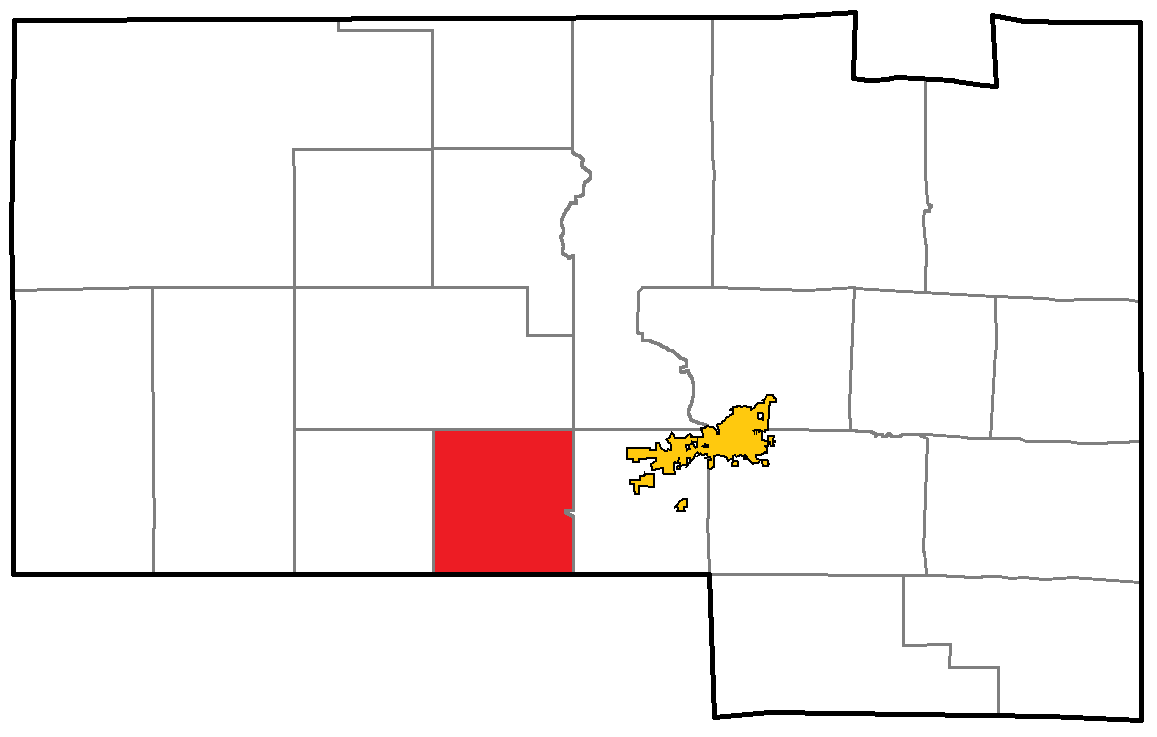
- Location of Woodboro, within Oneida County
- Coordinates: 45°35′48″N 89°36′53″W
- Country: United States
- State: Wisconsin
- County: Oneida

Government
  - Type: Civil Town exercising Village Powers
  - Town Chair: Phil Kriesel
  - Town Clerk: Judith May

Area
  - Total: 36.9 sq mi (95.7 km^{2})
  - Land: 34.6 sq mi (89.6 km^{2})
  - Water: 2.4 sq mi (6.1 km^{2})
- Elevation: 1,617 ft (493 m)

Population (2020)
  - Total: 808
  - Density: 23.4/sq mi (9.02/km^{2})
- Time zone: UTC-6 (Central (CST))
  - Summer (DST): UTC-5 (CDT)
- Area codes: 715 & 534
- FIPS code: 55-88625
- GNIS feature ID: 1584473
- Website: https://www.townofwoodboro.com/

Woodboro is a town in Oneida County, Wisconsin, United States. The population was 808 at the 2020 census. The unincorporated community of Woodboro is located in the town. The ghost town of Manson was located in the town.

== Geography ==
According to the United States Census Bureau, the town has a total area of 37.0 square miles (95.7 km^{2}), of which 34.6 square miles (89.6 km^{2}) is land and 2.4 square miles (6.1 km^{2}) (6.39%) is water.

== Demographics ==
As of the census of 2000, there were 685 people, 310 households, and 208 families residing in the town. The population density was 19.8 people per square mile (7.6/km^{2}). There were 592 housing units at an average density of 17.1 per square mile (6.6/km^{2}). The racial makeup of the town was 99.42% White, 0.29% Asian, 0.15% from other races, and 0.15% from two or more races. Hispanic or Latino of any race were 0.73% of the population.

There were 310 households, out of which 21.6% had children under the age of 18 living with them, 62.6% were married couples living together, 3.5% had a female householder with no husband present, and 32.6% were non-families. 26.8% of all households were made up of individuals, and 10.0% had someone living alone who was 65 years of age or older. The average household size was 2.21 and the average family size was 2.67.

In the town, the population was spread out, with 18.4% under the age of 18, 4.4% from 18 to 24, 28.8% from 25 to 44, 32.3% from 45 to 64, and 16.2% who were 65 years of age or older. The median age was 44 years. For every 100 females, there were 105.1 males. For every 100 females age 18 and over, there were 104.8 males.

The median income for a household in the town was $42,054, and the median income for a family was $51,250. Males had a median income of $37,788 versus $24,792 for females. The per capita income for the town was $21,079. About 4.0% of families and 6.7% of the population were below the poverty line, including none of those under age 18 and 18.8% of those age 65 or over.

== Government Planning ==
On April 14, 2009, the Town Board adopted a Comprehensive Plan. The Comprehensive Plan references and adopts, as a policy, the maintenance of an earlier Land Use Plan approved by the Town on November 11, 1997. On March 10, 2010, a civil action styled Eagle Cove Camp & Conference Center, Inc., et al., vs. Town of Woodboro, et al., was commenced in the federal district court for the Western District of Wisconsin, and docketed as #10-cv-118. The complaint alleges that the Land Use Plan and the related Oneida County Zoning and Shoreland Protection Ordinance violate the Religious Land Use and Institutionalized Persons Act of 2000 ("RLUIPA"), 42 U.S.C. Section 2000cc, et seq., as well as federal and Wisconsin constitutional provisions; declaratory and injunctive relief together with an unspecified amount of compensatory and punitive damages are sought.
