= Mans (surname) =

Mans is the surname of the following people

- George Mans (1940-2017), American football player, coach, and politician
- Jacques Pelletier du Mans (1517–1582), French humanist, poet, and mathematician
- Keith Mans (born 1946), British politician
- Mark Mans (born 1955), British military officer
- Perrie Mans (born 1940), South African snooker player

Until the twentieth century this surname in England was virtually confined to the Welsh Marcher counties and adjacent districts, reflecting the settlement there by King Henry II of his feudal followers who had accompanied him to England from [Le] Mans and other parts of Maine in France in 1154, a number of whom appear in medieval records under the name de Mans or del Mans(French and Latin respectively for 'of Mans' as Le Mans was then known, sometimes with the further description 'Cenomanus' making the city these men came from crystal clear. The name was sometimes spelled by Anglo-Norman clerks Mauns and de Mauns and later also Manns. (Calendar of the Records of the Corporation of Gloucester, Item 96, ca.1200; Fine Roles Henry III, 23 Aug. 1233 [Hereford];'Parishes: Doddenham', A History of the County of Worcester, volume 4 (1924), pp. 260-62.)

== See also ==
- Måns
