= Being Human =

Being Human may refer to:

== Books ==
- Being Human novels, a 2010 trilogy based on the British TV series
- Being Human, a 2011 poetry anthology by Neil Astley
- Being Human, a 2017 photo book by William Wegman
- Being Human: Bodies, Minds, Persons, a 2018 book by Rowan Williams
- Being Human: The Problem of Agency, a 2000 book by Margaret Archer

== Film and television ==
- Being Human (1994 film), a 1994 film starring Robin Williams
- Being Human (2010 film), a 2010 film
- Being Human (British TV series), a 2008–2013 BBC Three supernatural drama series
  - Being Human (North American TV series), a 2011–2014 North American remake

== Other uses ==
- Being Human (album), a 1999 album by Michael Peterson
- Being Human Foundation, an Indian charity for education and healthcare
- The human condition, or the unique features of being human
- Being Human, one of the galleries of the Wellcome Collection
- "Being Human", a 2022 song by Zior Park

== See also ==
- Human Being (disambiguation)
