= Justice Munson =

Justice Munson may refer to:

- Loveland Munson (1843–1921), chief justice of the Vermont Supreme Court
- Lyman E. Munson (1822–1908), associate justice of the Territorial Montana Supreme Court

== See also ==
- Judge Munson (disambiguation)
