= Månsson =

Månsson may refer to:

- Fabian Månsson (1872–1938), Swedish Socialist politician
- Gertrud Månsson (1866–1935), Swedish politician, first woman in the Stockholm city council.
- Månsson (writer) (1490–1557), Swedish ecclesiastic and writer
- Oliver Månsson (born 2009), Swedish footballer

== See also ==
- Menson (disambiguation)
- Manson (disambiguation)
- Mans (disambiguation)
