= Robert Stephen Adamson =

British botanist (1885–1965)

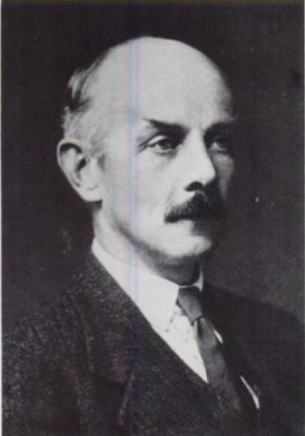
- Born: 2 March 1885; Manchester, England
- Died: 6 November 1965 (aged 80); Jedburgh, Scotland
- Scientific career
- Fields: Botany
- Workplaces: University of Manchester
- Author abbrev. (botany): Adamson

Robert Stephen Adamson (2 March 1885 – 6 November 1965) was a British botanist. He was a fellow of Linnean Society (elected in 1956), the British Ecological Society and the Royal Society of South Africa and its President in 1946-1948.

The standard author abbreviation Adamson is used to indicate this person as the author when citing a botanical name.

Adamson is commemorated in the specific epithet adamsonii.

== Works ==
- On the ecology of the Ooldea district (1922)
- The ecology of the eucalyptus forests of the Mount Lofty ranges (Adelaide district), South Australia (1924)
- The Botanical features of the south western Cape Province: essays (1929)
- A revision of the South African species of Juncus (1935)
- The vegetation of South Africa (1938)
- Notes on the vegetation of the Kamiesberg (1938)
- Flora of the Cape Peninsula (1950)
