= Måns Olström =

Swedish footballer (born 1996)

Personal information
- Full name: Måns John Viktor Olström
- Date of birth: 1 November 1996 (age 30)
- Place of birth: Kalmar, Sweden
- Height: 1.83 m (6 ft 0 in)
- Position: Forward

Youth career
- –2013: Lindsdals IF
- 2014–2015: Kalmar FF

Senior career*
Years	Team	Apps	(Gls)
2012–2013	Lindsdals IF	15	(2)
2014–2016	Kalmar FF	2	(0)
2016	→ Oskarshamns AIK (loan)	7	(1)
2017–2019	IFK Berga	71	(33)
2020–2022	Västra Frölunda IF	52	(8)
2023	IK Virgo	3	(1)
- * Club domestic league appearances and goals

Måns John Viktor Olström (born 1 November 1996) is a Swedish former professional footballer who played as a forward.
