= Mansons Landing Provincial Park =

Provincial park in British Columbia, Canada

- IUCN category II (national park)
- Location within Vancouver Island Location within British Columbia
- Interactive map of Mansons Landing Provincial Park
- Location: British Columbia, Canada
- Nearest city: Campbell River, BC
- Coordinates: 50°04′02″N 124°58′58″W
- Area: 100 hectares (250 acres)
- Established: 1974
- Governing body: BC Parks
- Website: bcparks.ca/mansons-landing-park/

Mansons Landing Provincial Park is a provincial park in British Columbia, Canada, located at Mansons Landing on Cortes Island. It was established in 1974 and covers 100 hectares (250 acres), including 47 hectares (120 acres) of upland and 53 hectares (130 acres) of foreshore.
