= Adamsson =

Adamsson is a Scandinavian surname.

- Ann-Mari Adamsson, Swedish actress
- Folke Adamsson, Swedish football manager and former player.
- Gösta Adamsson, Norwegian-born rower who represented Sweden
- Johan Adamsson, birth name of Juhani Aataminpoika, Finnish serial killer
- Stefan Adamsson, Swedish former cyclist
