= Son of man =

Phrase used in the Bible

"Son of man", "son of Adam", or "as a man", are phrases used in the Hebrew Bible, various apocalyptic works of the intertestamental period, and in the Greek New Testament. In the indefinite form ("son of Adam", "son of man", "like a man") used in the Hebrew Bible, it is a form of address; or it contrasts humans with God and the angels; or it contrasts foreign nations (like the Sasanian Empire and Babylon), which are often represented as animals (bear, goat, or ram) in apocalyptic writings, with Israel which is represented as human (a "son of man"); or it signifies an eschatological human figure.

The phrase is used in its indefinite form in the Septuagint, Biblical apocrypha and Pseudepigrapha. The Greek New Testament uses the earlier indefinite form while introducing a novel definite form, "the son of man."

== History ==
=== Jewish Bible ===
The Hebrew expression "son of man" (Hebrew: בן–אדם, romanized: ben-āḏām) appears 107 times in the Hebrew Bible, the majority (93 times) in the Book of Ezekiel. It is used in three main ways: as a form of address (Ezekiel); to contrast the lowly status of humanity against the permanence and exalted dignity of God and the angels (Numbers 23:19, Psalm 8:4); and as a future eschatological figure whose coming will signal the end of history and the time of God's judgment (Daniel 7:13–14).

Daniel 7 tells of a vision given to Daniel in which four "beasts," representing pagan nations, oppress the people of Israel until judged by God. Daniel 7:13–14 describes how the "Ancient of Days" (God) gives dominion over the earth to "one like a son of man (כבר אנש [kibar 'anash])". The passage in Daniel 7:13 occurs in Biblical Aramaic.

Later, in chapter 7, it is explained that "one like a man" certainly implies a "human being" and also stands for "the saints of the Most High" (7:18, 21–22) and "the people of the saints of the Most High" (7:27). The "saints" and "people of the saints," in turn, probably stand for the Israelites – the vision sees it that God will take dominion over the world away from the beast-like pagan "nations" and give it to human-like Israel.

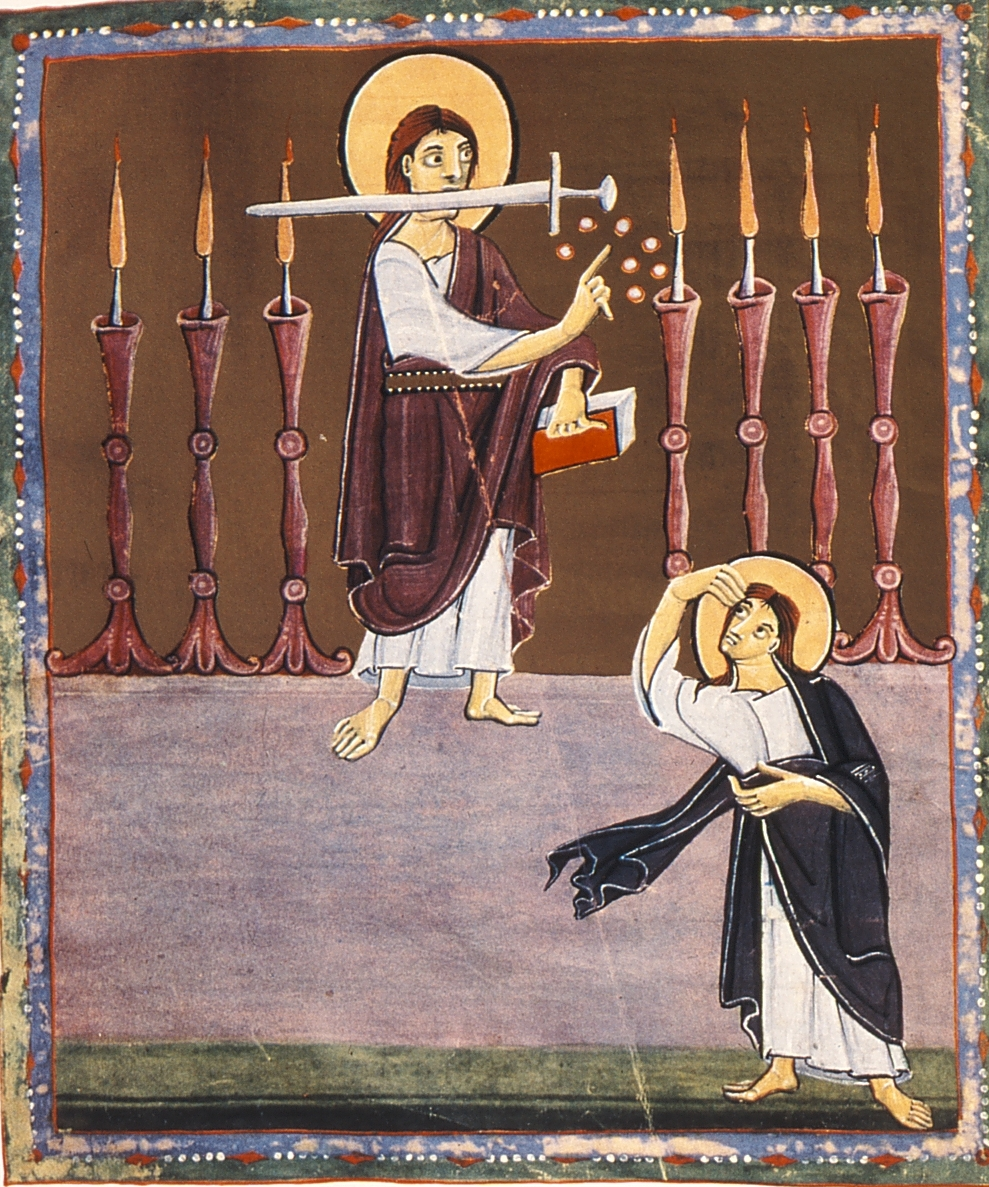
"One like a son of man" with a sword among the seven lampstands, in John's vision. From the Bamberg Apocalypse, 11th century.

=== Apocrypha and Pseudepigrapha ===
Although Daniel's 7:13 "like a son of man" has been interpreted as standing for the Messiah (e.g. in Rashi's Commentary on the Tanakh), this interpretation was probably introduced by later apocryphal and deuterocanonical works such as the Similitudes (or Parables) of Enoch and 4 Ezra. Whether these messianic "Son of Man" references are genuinely Jewish or the result of Christian interpolation is disputed. An example of a disputed section is that of The Similitudes (1 Enoch 37–71) which uses Daniel 7 to produce an unparalleled messianic Son of Man, pre-existent and hidden yet ultimately revealed, functioning as judge, vindicator of righteousness, and universal ruler. The Enochic messianic figure is an individual representing a group (the Righteous One who represents the righteous, the Elect One representing the elect), but in 4 Ezra 13 (also called 2 Esdras) he becomes an individual man.

=== New Testament ===
The New Testament features the indefinite "a son of man" in Hebrews 2:6 (citing Psalm 8:4), and "one like the son of man" in Revelation 1:13, 14:14 (referencing Daniel 7:13's "one like a son of man"). The Gospels introduce a new definite form, ὁ υἱὸς τοῦ ἀνθρώπου, literally 'the son of the man,' an awkward and ambiguous expression in Greek. It functions as an emphatic equivalent of the first-person pronoun I/me/my, and in all four gospels it is used only by Jesus (except once in the Gospel of John, when the crowd asks what Jesus means by it). German theologian Rudolf Bultmann sees the phrase not as one genuinely used by Jesus but as one inserted by the early Church, but theologian C. F. D. Moule argues that the phrase, "so far from being a title evolved from current apocalyptic thought by the early Church and put by it onto the lips of Jesus, is among the most important symbols used by Jesus himself to describe his vocation and that of those whom he summoned to be with him."

The title "Son of Man" is the most frequently used designation for Jesus in the Gospels, particularly in his own self-references. Outside the Gospels, however, "Christ" (Messiah) becomes the dominant title, especially in the writings of Paul and the broader New Testament epistles.

In the New Testament, Jesus combines the titles "Son of Man" and "Son of God" in key theological moments. In his conversation with Nicodemus, he unites both titles while speaking of his divine mission and salvation. At his trial before the Sanhedrin, he affirms his identity by linking them again. Other instances include his discourse on resurrection and judgment, Peter’s confession at Caesarea Philippi, and Martha’s confession before the raising of Lazarus.

== The term in the source languages ==
The exact words used for "son of man" vary, depending on the source language.

- Hebrew: בן אדם, romanized: ben-āḏām, lit. 'son of Adam'
- Imperial Aramaic: בר אנש, romanized: bar 'enash, lit. 'son of man'
- Imperial Aramaic: כבר אנש, romanized: kibar 'anash, lit. 'like a son of man' — see Son of man (Judaism)
- Koine Greek: ὡς υἱὸς ἀνθρώπου, romanized: hōs huios anthrōpou, lit. 'like a son of man' – per the Septuagint in Dan. 7:13 [LXX].
- Koine Greek: ὁ υἱὸς τοῦ ἀνθρώπου, romanized: ho huios tou anthrōpou, lit. 'the son of the human being' – per the New Testament, see Son of man (Christianity)

== See also ==
- Adam Kadmon
- Children of Men – 2006 film by Alfonso Cuarón
- Son of man (Christianity)
- Son of man (Judaism)
- Son of perdition
- Son of God
