= Adamsen =

Adamsen is a surname. Notable people with the surname include:

- Maja Adamsen (born 1978), Danish cyclist
- Søren Adamsen / Søren Nico Adamsen, Swedish musician, former member of Crystal Eyes and Artillery
- Morten Adamsen (born 1981), Norwegian rower
