= Human Being (disambiguation) =

A human being is a member of the species classified as Homo sapiens.

Human Being may also refer to:

- Human Being (album), a 1998 album by Seal
  - "Human Beings" (song), a song from the album
- "Human Being", a song by Terrorvision from Formaldehyde
- "Human Being", a song by Robyn from Honey (2018)

== See also ==
- Being Human (disambiguation)
- Human (disambiguation)
- "Humans Being", a 1996 single by Van Halen
