= Son of man (Judaism) =

Translation of one Hebrew and one Aramaic phrase used in the Hebrew Bible

"Son of man" is the translation of one Hebrew and one Aramaic phrase used in the Hebrew Bible. In Hebrew, the term is ben-adam, while in Aramaic its equivalent bar-adam is used. In the Book of Daniel and in post-biblical literature, the similar terms bar-anosh and bar-nasha also appear.

The Hebrew expression "son of man" (בן–אדם i.e. ben-'adam) appears 107 times in the Hebrew Bible. This is the most common Hebrew construction for the singular, appearing 93 times in the Book of Ezekiel alone and 14 times elsewhere. In thirty two cases, the phrase appears in intermediate plural form "sons of men". As generally interpreted by Jews, "son of man" denotes mankind generally, in contrast to deity or godhead, with special reference to their weakness and frailty.

== Post-biblical literature ==
The most common post-biblical use is similar to that of the English word "human". For example:

=== Story of Haninah ben Dosa ===
כד הוות נכית לבר נשא אין בר נשא קדים למיא חברברא מיית ואין חברברא קדטם למיא בר נשא מיית

When it bites the son of man (בר נשא: [bar nasha']), if the son of man (בר נשא [bar nasha']) reaches the water first, then snake dies; and if the snake reaches the water first, the son of man (בר נשא [bar nasha']) dies.

— Y. Ber 5. 1/26 (9a)

"Ḥanina never permitted anything to turn him from his devotions. Once, while thus engaged, a lizard bit him, but he did not interrupt his prayers. To his disciples' anxious inquiries he answered that he had been so preoccupied in prayer as not even to feel the bite. When the people found the reptile, dead, they exclaimed, "Woe to the man whom a lizard bites, and woe to the lizard that bites R. Ḥanina b. Dosa!" His wonderful escape is accounted for by the assertion that the result of a lizard's bite depends upon which reaches water first, the man or the lizard; if the former, the latter dies; if the latter, the former dies. In Ḥanina's case a spring miraculously opened under his very feet (Yer. Ber. v. 9a). The Babylonian Gemara (Ber. 33a) has a different version of this miracle."

== Apocryphal literature ==
=== 1QapGen ===
ואשגה זרעך כעפר ארשא די לא ישכח בר אנוש לממדיה

And I will multiply your seed like the dirt of the earth which no son of man (בר אנוש [bar 'anosh]) can count.

— 1QapGen. XXI.13: MT שיא (Gen. 13.16)

== Interpretation ==
1. As generally interpreted by Jews, "son of man" denotes mankind generally in contrast to deity or godhead, with special reference to the human weakness and frailty (Job 25:6; Psalms 8:4; Psalms 144:3; Psalms 146:3; Isaiah 51:12, etc.)
2. The term "ben adam" is but a formal substitute for the personal pronoun or maybe a title given to the prophet Ezekiel, probably to remind him of his human weakness.

"Son of man" in Job 25 and Psalm 146 is ben adam (Hebrew: בן־אדם), and "son of man" in Psalms 144 is ben enosh (Hebrew: בן־אנוש).

Among Jews the term "son of man" was not used as the specific title of the Messiah. The New Testament expression ὅ ὑιὸς τοῦ ἀνθρόπου is a translation of the Aramaic "bar nasha," and as such could have been understood only as the substitute for a personal pronoun, or as emphasizing the human qualities of those to whom it is applied. That the term does not appear in any of the epistles ascribed to Paul is significant. In the [Christian] Gospels the title occurs eighty-one times. Most (..) have come to the conclusion that Jesus, speaking Aramaic, could never have designated himself as the "son of man" in a Messianic, mystic sense, because the Aramaic term never implied this meaning.

== Bibliography ==
- Berger, David; Wyschogrod, Michael (1978). Jews and "Jewish Christianity". [New York]: KTAV Publ. House. ISBN 0-87068-675-5.
- Kaplan, Aryeh (1985). The real Messiah? a Jewish response to missionaries (New ed.). New York: National Conference of Synagogue Youth. ISBN 978-1879016118. The real Messiah (pdf)
