= National Register of Historic Places listings in Vilas County, Wisconsin =

Location of Vilas County in Wisconsin

This is a list of the National Register of Historic Places listings in Vilas County, Wisconsin. It is intended to provide a comprehensive listing of entries in the National Register of Historic Places that are located in Vilas County, Wisconsin. The locations of National Register properties for which the latitude and longitude coordinates are included below may be seen in a map.

There are 19 properties and districts listed on the National Register in the county. Another property was once listed but has been removed.

This National Park Service list is complete through NPS recent listings posted August 8, 2025.

== Current listings ==
	Name on the Register	Image	Date listed	Location	City or town	Description
1	Anvil Lake Campground Shelter	Anvil Lake Campground Shelter	May 21, 1996 (#96000542)	Jct. of Anvil Lake Rd. and WI 70; 45°56′14″N 89°03′39″W	Eagle River	Rustic styled picnic shelter and bathhouse planned by the Forest Service and built by CCC Camp Nine Mile and the Imogene Lake Transient Camp in 1936, during the Great Depression.
2	Archeological Site No. 47VI197	Archeological Site No. 47VI197	August 5, 1994 (#94000816)	Address Restricted	St. Germain	
3	Big Sand Lake Club	Big Sand Lake Club	January 12, 2005 (#04001487)	4571 Big Sand Lake Club Rd. 46°04′14″N 88°57′12″W	Phelps	Private resort of wealthy Chicagoans, among others, since 1891. When the 2.5-story hemlock clubhouse was rebuilt around 1924, it was considered the largest log building in Wisconsin. Includes a 1925 fish-cleaning house, a 1920 manager's house, an ice house, a 1910 water tower, and a 240-foot dock.
4	Eagle River Downtown Historic District		February 6, 2025 (#100011229)	100-114 E Division St, 105-128 S Railroad St, 100-218 and 221-223 E Wall St, 118-123 S Main St, and 6 W Wall St; 45°55′00″N 89°15′09″W	Eagle River	Part of the old downtown, with 36 contributing businesses built from the lumbering era to the tourism era, including the 1888 Boomtown-style Dr. Haddy building, the 1890 Hirzel saloon and cafe, the 1890 Eagle River Hospital, the 1923 C&NW Railroad depot, the 1923 Neoclassical-style First National Bank, the 1923 Ewald Bros. Feed Store, the 1953 southwest-style Red Wing Trading Post, and the 1965 Elko's Holiday Corner.
5	Eagle River Stadium	Eagle River Stadium	June 24, 1994 (#94000650)	4149 WI 70; 45°54′38″N 89°12′48″W	Eagle River	Built in 1933 by local townspeople with a lamella truss dome on land donated by Charles F. Taylor, this was the first indoor hockey arena in Wisconsin. It has also hosted boxing, circuses, roller-skating, and today the Wisconsin Hockey Hall of Fame.
6	The Everett Resort	The Everett Resort	October 8, 2008 (#08000982)	1269 Everett Rd. 45°54′35″N 89°10′24″W	Washington	Large resort on Eagle River chain of lakes started in 1890s, charging on the American Plan. Buildings are in Craftsman and Rustic styles. In the 1930s the dining room could serve 300 guests.
7	Fort Eagle	Fort Eagle	August 20, 1998 (#98001090)	934 Fort Eagle Ln. 46°03′10″N 88°59′27″W	Phelps	Vacation estate on Big Sand Lake of "Homeless Homer" Galpin, once-tarnished head of the Chicago Republican party and promoter of Northwoods tourism. The estate consists of a southern Colonial Revival/Craftsman mansion, cottages, boathouse, etc., built from 1919 to 1927.
8	Government Boarding School at Lac du Flambeau	Government Boarding School at Lac du Flambeau	January 14, 2005 (#04001005)	838 Whitefeather St. 45°58′13″N 89°54′12″W	Lac du Flambeau	School where the federal government tried to forcibly assimilate Ojibwe, Potawatomi and Menominee children into white society from 1895 to 1940. The school continued under tribal control into the 1990s.
9	Nicolaus H. Hultin House	Nicolaus H. Hultin House	January 9, 1997 (#96001582)	2196 To-To-Tom Ln., N of jct. with Indian Village Rd. 45°57′23″N 89°54′17″W	Lac du Flambeau	Rustic French Norman "piece sur piece" chateau with Scandinavian overtones, built in 1923, with boathouse, on the peninsula between Lake To To Tom and Long Interlaken. Hultin was a Swedish immigrant who became a prominent funeral director in Chicago, and built this retreat up north.
10	Jabodon	Jabodon	March 25, 2009 (#09000164)	1460 Everett Road; 45°54′58″N 89°10′00″W	Washington	Vacation estate on Cranberry Lake. The Craftsman style house was built in 1924 for William B. Johnson. Chicago businessman Abram Pritzker bought it in 1937 and added the wet boathouse.
11	Mayo School	Mayo School	March 7, 1994 (#94000135)	2301 Townhall Rd. 45°57′52″N 89°13′03″W	Eagle River	Stucco-clad 2-room rural state-graded school built in 1924 by Paul Scharf and M. Sauer. Now serves as the Washington Town Hall.
12	Peacock Inn		January 17, 2017 (#100000519)	8780 WI 70; 45°55′08″N 89°31′59″W	St. Germain	Rustic northwoods tavern/restaurant built in 1930 by Joe Zellner, with peeled-log walls and a cobblestone chimney.
13	Region Nine Training School	Region Nine Training School	August 8, 1996 (#96000890)	611 Sheridan St. 45°55′18″N 89°14′45″W	Eagle River	Complex of Rustic-style buildings, with the oldest built in 1937 by CCCs. Until 1942, used as a training center for National Forest managers; since 1946, as the conference center of Trees For Tomorrow.
14	St. Peter's Catholic School	St. Peter's Catholic School	October 4, 2018 (#100003008)	115 S 3rd St. 45°54′57″N 89°14′47″W	Eagle River	Brick graded elementary school built in 1926 by St. Peter's Catholic Parish, used for that purpose until 2004. Now houses the Northwoods Center, a cultural organization.
15	Ben and Margaret Stone Boathouse		February 7, 2008 (#08000017)	8810 Co. Rd. N 45°59′42″N 89°32′08″W	Plum Lake	Two-story wet boathouse on Plum Lake, built in Craftsman style in 1928. Ben worked in various lumber companies in Wausau and Ladysmith.
16	Strawberry Island Site	Strawberry Island Site	March 8, 1978 (#78000340)	Address Restricted	Lac du Flambeau	Largely undisturbed site of three Native American occupations, starting in 200 BC. The site is also important in Ojibwe beliefs.
17	Sunset Point	Sunset Point	November 4, 1993 (#93001169)	1024 Everett Rd. 45°54′03″N 89°11′00″W	Eagle River	Chicago gambler Mont Tennes had his estate on Catfish Lake built in French Normandy style in 1928.
18	Voss' Birchwood Lodge	Voss' Birchwood Lodge	June 8, 2018 (#100002554)	5500-5518 USH 51, 5534-5537 Henry Voss, 12958-12994 Ruth Voss & 12930-12954 Palmer Lns. 46°06′48″N 89°49′25″W	Manitowish Waters	In 1910 Henry and Ruth Voss started a summer resort on Spider Lake with two Rustic-styled cabins and a larger main lodge which was also the Voss's summer home. After US-51 was built nearby around 1924, they added a Craftsman-styled main lodge, more cabins, a garage, diner, tavern and dance hall. Still runs on American Plan and still operated by Vosses.
19	Wallila Farm	Wallila Farm	July 23, 1992 (#92000851)	Address Restricted; 46°02′22″N 89°06′58″W	Phelps	Pioneer Finnish farm from early 1900s.

== Former listings ==
	Name on the Register	Image	Date listed	Date removed	Location	City or town	Description
1	Presque Isle State Graded School		March 25, 1993 (#93000158)	March 6, 2001	Jct. of Co. Trunk Hwy. B and School Loop St.	Presque Isle	School designed in Art Deco style by Oppenhamer and Obel of Wausau and built in 1939. Demolished by 2001.

== See also ==
- List of National Historic Landmarks in Wisconsin
- National Register of Historic Places listings in Wisconsin
- Listings in neighboring counties: Forest, Gogebic (MI), Iron, Iron (MI), Oneida, Price
