= Wisconsin Highway 155 =

State highway in Wisconsin, United States

State Trunk Highway 155
- WIS 155 highlighted in red

Route information
- Maintained by WisDOT
- Length: 6.94 mi (11.17 km)

Major junctions
- South end: WIS 70 in St. Germain
- North end: CTH-N in Sayner

Location
- Country: United States
- State: Wisconsin
- Counties: Vilas

Highway system
- Wisconsin State Trunk Highway System; Interstate; US; State; Scenic; Rustic
← WIS 154	→ WIS 156

State Trunk Highway 155 (often called Highway 155, STH-155 or WIS 155) is a 6.94-mile (11.17 km) state highway in Vilas County, Wisconsin, United States, that runs north–south from Wisconsin Highway 70 (WIS 70) St. Germain to the northern of two junctions with County Trunk Highway N (CTH‑N) Sayner. The highway is maintained by the Wisconsin Department of Transportation.

== Route description ==
WIS 155 begins at a junction with WIS 70 in the community of St. Germain. From here, the highway heads north through a forested region with many lakes; the route lies entirely within the Northern Highland-American Legion State Forest. The route passes through the Town of St. Germain to the east of Big Saint Germain Lake before curving to the northwest to bypass Lost Lake. After crossing a small creek, the highway turns west toward a junction with County Highway C. WIS 155 turns north at the junction and continues through a populated area south of Sayner. The route curves northwest into Sayner, entering the Town of Plum Lake as it does so. The highway intersects CTH‑N in Sayner, and the two highways run concurrently through Sayner. The routes run through a mixed residential and business district, passing the Vilas County Historical Museum and the Plum Lake Library. WIS 155 ends in northern Sayner at another junction with CTH‑N, which continues to the west; Plum Lake lies to the north of the terminus.

== History ==
Before becoming a State Trunk Highway, it was a County Trunk Highway, signed CTH‑S, running from WIS* 70 to Star Lake. In 1923/1924, the part south of Sayner was signed as WIS 72. In 1926/1927, the highway was renumbered to WIS 155. The route was unpaved and would stay that way until at least 1956.

== Major intersections ==
The entire route is in Vilas County.

Location	mi	km	Destinations	Notes
Community of St. Germain	0.0	0.0	WIS 70 east – Eagle River WIS 70 west – Arbor Vitae, Woodruff	Southern terminus; WIS 70 heads south and west from the intersection and a local street (St. German Boulevard) heads east
St. Germain	5.6	9.0	CTH-C south – WIS 70	T intersection
Sayner	6.4	10.3	CTH-N east – CTH-K	Southern end of CTH-N concurrency
Sayner	6.9	11.1	CTH-N west – US 51	Northern terminus; northern end of CTH-N concurrency; Local streets head north (Fabian Drive) and east (Lake Street) from the intersection
1.000 mi = 1.609 km; 1.000 km = 0.621 mi
