= Jabodon =

- U.S. National Register of Historic Places
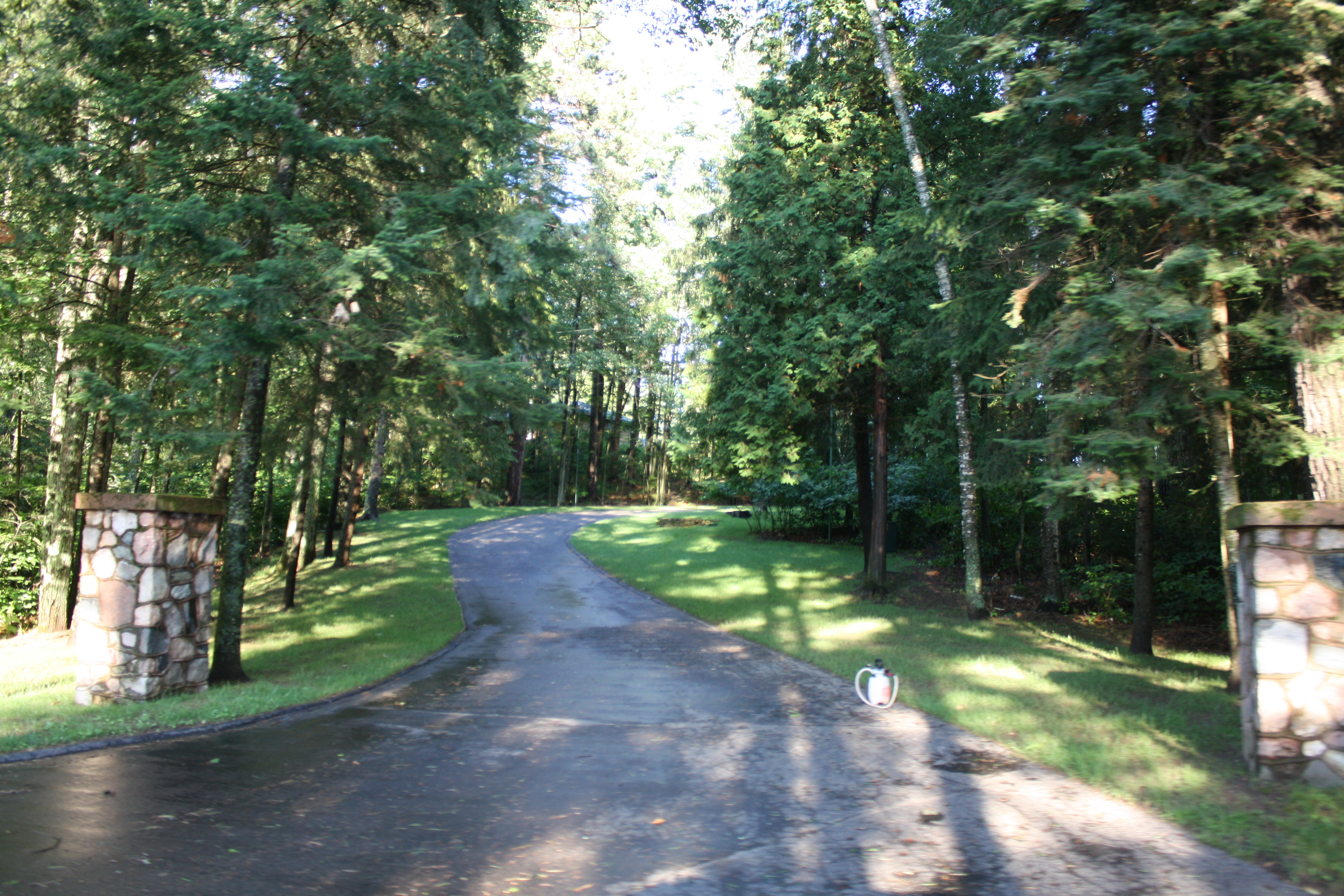
- The entrance to Jabodon

- Location within Wisconsin Location within the United States
- Location: 1460 Everett Rd., Washington, Wisconsin
- Coordinates: 45°54′57″N 89°9′56″W
- Area: 3.4 acres (1.4 ha)
- Built: 1924
- Architectural style: Late 19th And Early 20th Century American Movements
- NRHP reference No.: 09000164
- Added to NRHP: March 25, 2009

Jabodon is a historic vacation resort in the Town of Washington, Vilas County, Wisconsin. The resort is located on Cranberry Lake in the Eagle River Chain of Lakes and exemplifies Northern Wisconsin vacation resorts of the early 20th century. Land was set aside for Jabodon in 1922 by the Everett Resort, a larger resort established in the 1890s. Jabodon's main house, an American Craftsman house, was constructed in 1924; its boathouse was likely built in the same year. The original boathouse later burned in a fire and was rebuilt in 1937. Additional amenities such as a swimming pool and tennis courts were added to the site in the 1940s. Jabodon was added to the National Register of Historic Places on March 25, 2009.
