= Plum Lake (Wisconsin) =

Lake in Wisconsin, United States

- Interactive map of Plum Lake
- Location: Vilas County, Wisconsin
- Coordinates: 46°00′12″N 89°31′09″W
- Type: Glacial drainage
- Part of: Manitowish River watershed
- Average depth: ~20 ft (6.1 m)
- Max. depth: 57 ft (17 m)
- Settlements: Sayner, Wisconsin

Plum Lake is a 1,057-acre glacial drainage lake located in Vilas County, Wisconsin, within the Town of Plum Lake which also includes the towns of Sayner and Star Lake. With an average depth of roughly 20 ft, the lake has a maximum depth of 57 ft and is made of a sandy-gravel rock bottom. Surrounded by old growth hardwood pines, the lake is part of the Manitowish River watershed and supports a diverse fishery and is managed by the Wisconsin Department of Natural Resources.

== History ==
The lake was ford during the Last Ice Age and has historically been used by the Anishinaabe (Ojibwe/Chippewa) peoples and other native groups who relied on the lake and its surrounding area for hunting, fishing, and rice harvesting for thousands of years prior to European settlement. The lake formed part of their canoe network linking the Wisconsin River to Lake Superior. Their frequent travel routes would influence European settlement patterns, and the lake would see increasing European settlement beginning in the mid-19th century. By 1911, the area to the southeast of the lake would have a small logging and tourism community focused on the natural White Pines. As the logging boom slowed, nearby Sayner began to focus on tourism, building a number of resorts attracting visitors from Chicago and Milwaukee. During this period, the lake shifted from a transportation route to a leisure destination focused on boating and angling. The is a golf course located to the south of the lake.

== Habitat ==
The lake and its surrounding area provide habitat for a number of species, including:

- Muskellunge
- Walleye
- Northern pike
- Smallmouth bass
- Bluegill
- Largemouth bass
- Rock bass
- Creek chub
- Golden shiner
- Burbot
- Ducks
- Loons
- Great Blue Heron
- Osprey
- Deer
- Black bear
- Red fox
- Beaver
- Muskrat
- Snapping turtle
- Toads
- Green frog
