= Edward A. Everett =

Edward A. Everett may refer to:

- Edward A. Everett (Wisconsin politician)
- Edward A. Everett (New York politician)
