= The Everett Resort =

Coordinates: 45°54′38″N 89°10′23″W

- U.S. National Register of Historic Places
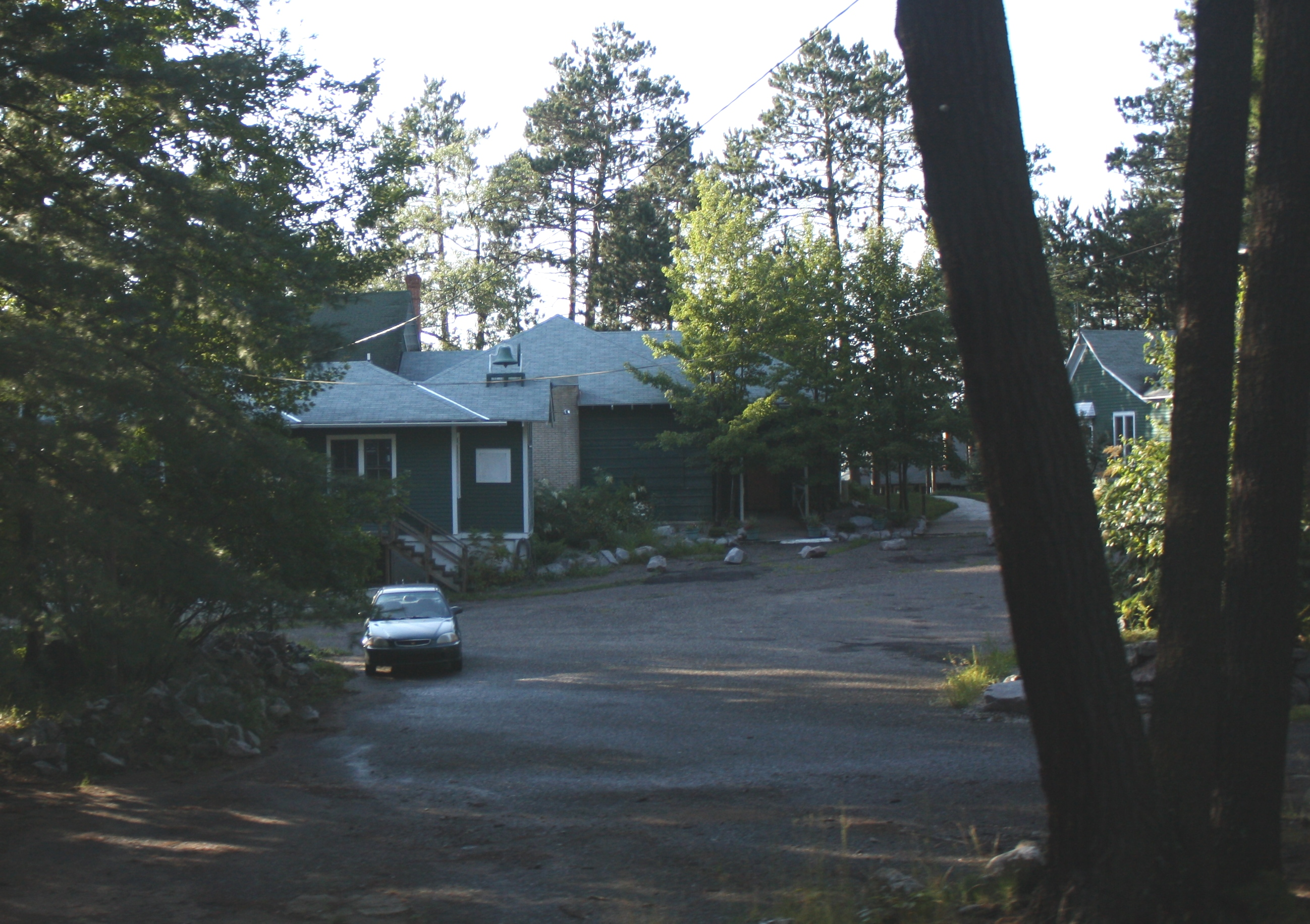
- The Everett Resort
- Location: 1269 Washington Rd. Washington, Vilas County, Wisconsin
- NRHP reference No.: 08000982

The Everett Resort is located in Washington, Vilas County, Wisconsin, on a peninsula between Catfish and Cranberry Lakes. Started in the 1890s, it was one of the first resorts in the area. It was added to the National Register of Historic Places in 2008. It is situated about 4 miles east of the city of Eagle River, and is served by its post office.

== History ==
The resort was established by Fred Morey in the 1890s, just as logging was winding down. In 1897, ownership was transferred to Edward and Helen Everett.
