= Daniel E. Riordan =

American politician (1863–1942)

Daniel E. Riordan (September 7, 1863 – November 19, 1942) was a member of the Wisconsin State Senate.

== Biography ==
Riordan was born on September 7, 1863, in Berlin, Wisconsin. He moved to Hayward, Wisconsin, in 1891 and to Eagle River, Wisconsin, in 1892 before later moving to Milwaukee, Wisconsin. Riordan taught school and was a lawyer. He also became involved in real estate around 1900. He died on November 19, 1942, in Oshkosh, Wisconsin.

== Political career ==
Riordan represented the 30th District in the Senate during the 1897 through 1903 sessions. In 1895, he had been appointed as a judge of the municipal court of Vilas County, Wisconsin, by Governor William H. Upham. The following year, Riordan declined a nomination for District Attorney of Vilas County. He was a Republican.
