= Ben and Margaret Stone Boathouse =

- Stone, Ben and Margaret, Boathouse
- U.S. National Register of Historic Places
- Location within Wisconsin Location within the United States
- Location: 8810 County Highway N, Plum Lake, Wisconsin
- Coordinates: 45°59′42″N 89°32′8″W
- Area: less than one acre
- Built: 1928
- Architectural style: Bungalow/craftsman
- NRHP reference No.: 08000017
- Added to NRHP: February 7, 2008

The Ben and Margaret Stone Boathouse is a historic boathouse in Plum Lake, Wisconsin. The boathouse was built in 1928 by Ben and Margaret Stone of Tripoli, Wisconsin. It was built in the American Craftsman style and is one of the few two-story boathouses on Plum Lake. The boathouse was listed on the National Register of Historic Places on February 7, 2008.
