= Sunset Point =

Sunset Point may refer to:

== United States ==
- Sunset Point (Arizona), a cliff in Yavapai County
- Sunset Point, Florida, a place in Florida
- Sunset Point (Delphi, Indiana), the confluence of Deer Creek and the Wabash River, listed on the National Register of Historic Places in Carroll County
- Sunset Point (Yarmouth, Maine), a promontory on Casco Bay
- Sunset Point (Eagle River, Wisconsin), a historic estate on Catfish Lake

== Other places ==
- Sunset Point, Alberta, village in Alberta, Canada
- Sunset Point, a tourist location in Kasauli, a town in Solan district of North Indian state of Himachal Pradesh
- Sunset Point, an area of Pushkar, Ajmer, Rajasthan, India
