= Star Lake, Wisconsin =

- Unincorporated community
- Location within Wisconsin Location within the United States
- Coordinates: 46°02′18″N 89°28′21″W
- Country: United States
- State: Wisconsin
- County: Vilas
- Elevation: 1,736 ft (529 m)
- Time zone: UTC-6 (Central (CST))
  - Summer (DST): UTC-5 (CDT)
- ZIP code: 54561
- Area codes: 715 & 534
- GNIS feature ID: 1574822

Star Lake is an unincorporated community located in Vilas County, Wisconsin, United States. Star Lake is located on the northeastern shore of Star Lake, northwest of Eagle River. It is one of two unincorporated communities in the town of Plum Lake, the other being Sayner. Star Lake has a post office, which was downgraded to a Community Post Office on February 8, 1997.
