= Anvil Lake Campground Shelter =

- U.S. National Register of Historic Places
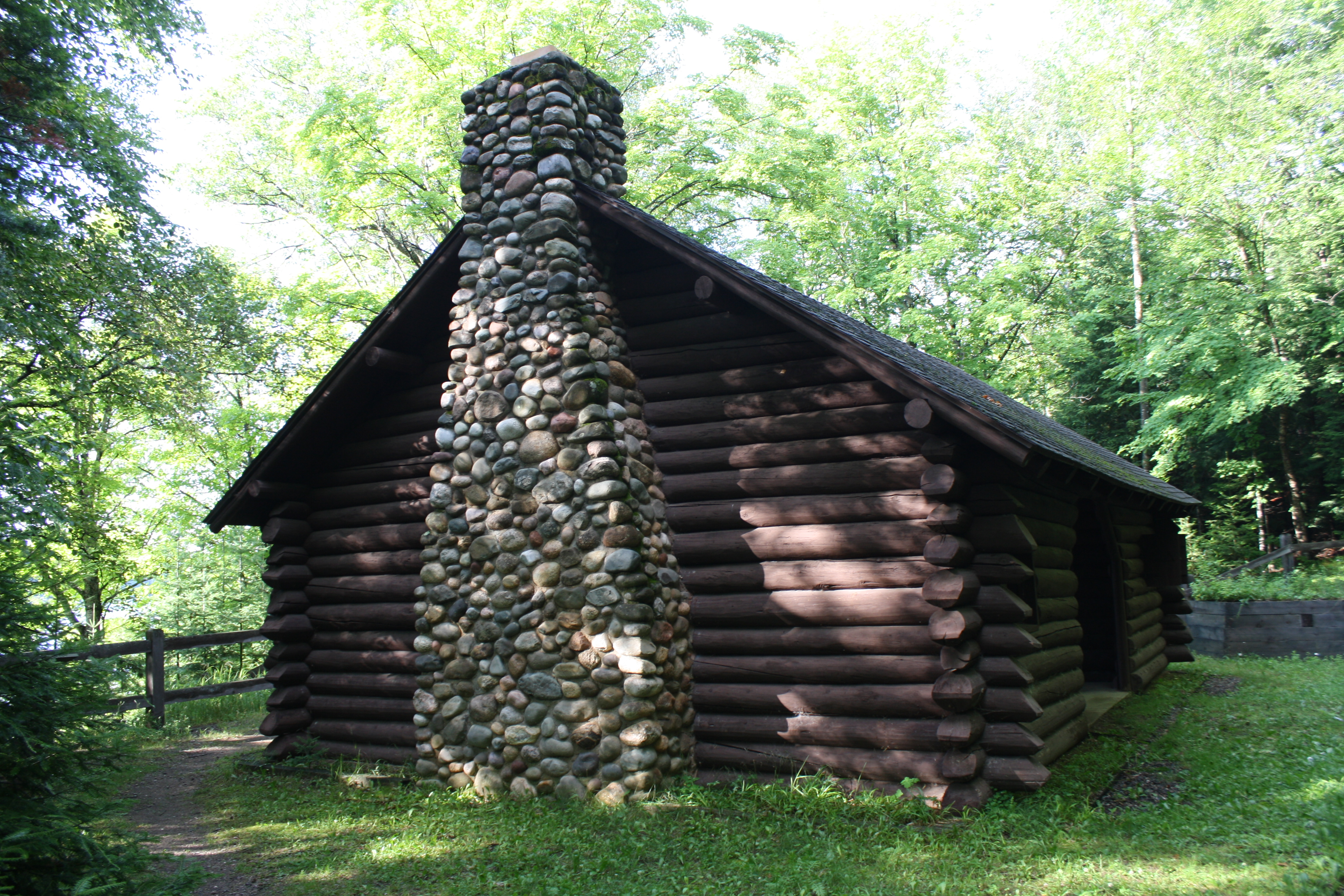
- Anvil Lake Campground Shelter
- Location: Eagle River, Wisconsin
- Built: 1936
- Architectural style: Rustic
- NRHP reference No.: 96000542
- Added to NRHP: May 21, 1996

The Anvil Lake Campground Shelter is located in Eagle River, Wisconsin. It was built by the Civilian Conservation Corps of the New Deal and was added to the National Register of Historic Places in 1996.
