= Phelps (community), Wisconsin =

Phelps, Wisconsin
- Unincorporated community
- Location within Wisconsin Location within the United States
- Coordinates: 46°03′52″N 89°05′15″W
- Country: United States
- State: Wisconsin
- County: Vilas
- Elevation: 1,732 ft (528 m)
- Time zone: UTC-6 (Central (CST))
  - Summer (DST): UTC-5 (CDT)
- ZIP code: 54554
- Area codes: 715 & 534
- GNIS feature ID: 1580131

Phelps is an unincorporated community located in the town of Phelps, Vilas County, Wisconsin, United States. Phelps is located on Wisconsin Highway 17, 13 miles (21 km) northeast of Eagle River on the eastern end of North Twin Lake. Phelps has a post office with ZIP code 54554. The community was established in 1902.
