= Edward A. Everett (Wisconsin politician) =

American politician

Edward A. Everett was an American politician. He was a member of the Wisconsin State Assembly.

== Biography ==
Everett was born on March 23, 1861, in Beloit, Wisconsin. He later worked in the hotel industry in Chicago, Illinois before moving to Eagle River, Wisconsin in 1896. The following year, he took ownership of what would become known as The Everett Resort in nearby Washington, Vilas County, Wisconsin. In 2008, the resort was added to the National Register of Historic Places.

== Assembly career ==
Everett was a member of the Assembly during the 1905, 1907, 1915 and 1917 sessions. He was a Republican.
