= Eagle River (Wisconsin River tributary) =

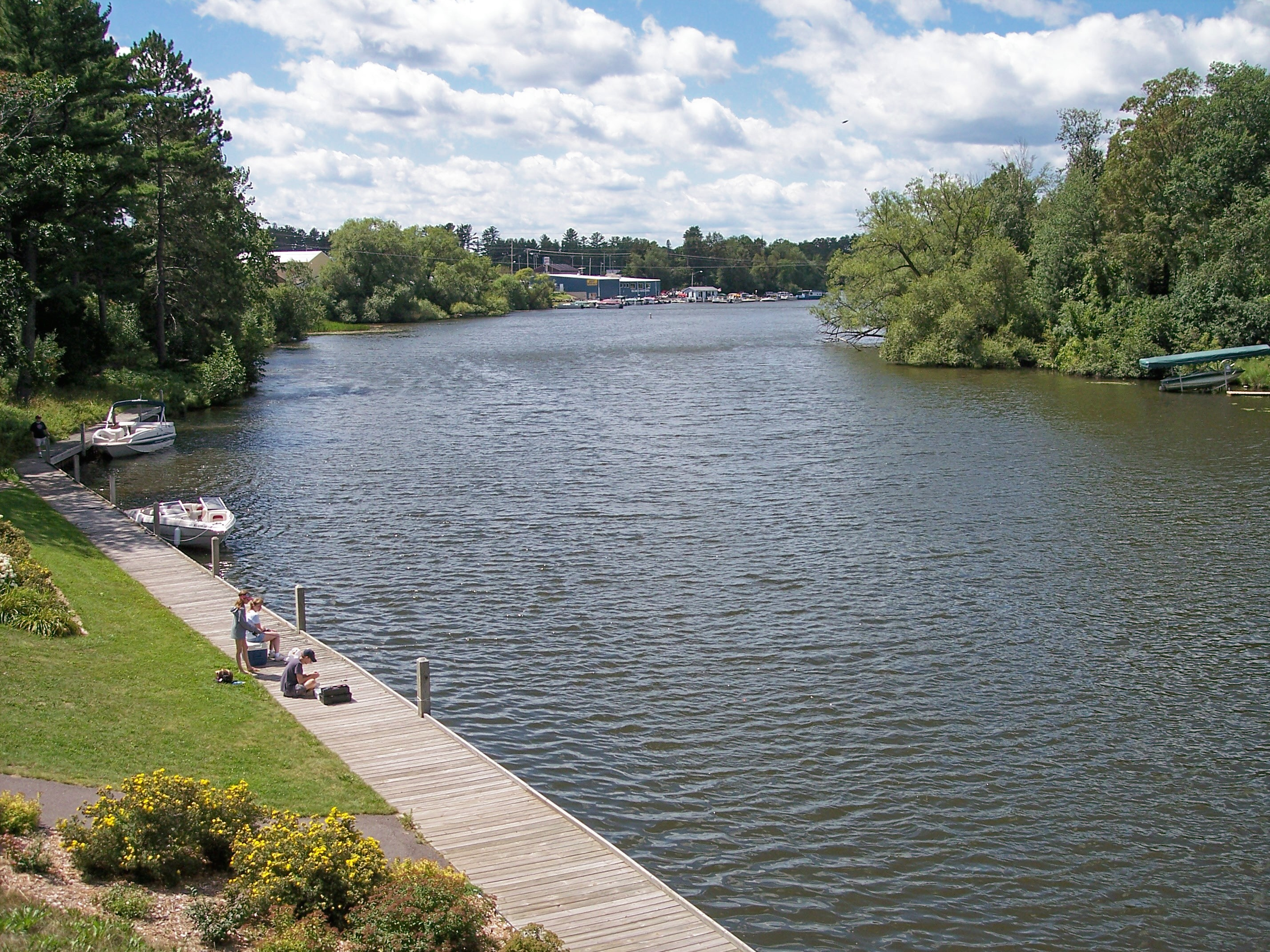
- The Eagle River in the city of Eagle River in 2006

- Location of the mouth of the Eagle River Eagle River (Wisconsin River tributary) (the United States)

Location
- Country: United States
- State: Wisconsin

Physical characteristics
- Source
  - location: Forest County
  - coordinates: 45°41′31″N 89°01′16″W
  - elevation: 1,664 ft (507 m)
- Mouth: Watersmeet Lake on the Wisconsin River
  - location: Lincoln
  - coordinates: 45°54′34″N 89°17′22″W
  - elevation: 1,614 ft (492 m)
- Basin size: 181.7 sq mi (471 km^{2})

The Eagle River is a tributary of the Wisconsin River in northeastern Wisconsin in the United States. Via the Wisconsin River, it is part of the watershed of the Mississippi River, draining an area of 181.7 square miles (470.6 km^{2}) in the state's Northern Highland region. The river flows for much of its length through a series of lakes; the network of 28 lakes in the Eagle River's watershed is locally claimed to be the "world's largest chain of inland freshwater lakes."

The Eagle River rises in extreme western Forest County in the Chequamegon-Nicolet National Forest, and flows generally northwestwardly in northeastern Oneida County and southeastern Vilas County, passing through the Oneida County town of Three Lakes and the Vilas County towns of Washington and Lincoln, and the city of Eagle River. Along its course it flows through Big, Dog, Deer, Big Stone, Laurel, Medicine, Little Fork, Island, Round, Planting Ground, and Long Lakes in Oneida County; and Cranberry, Catfish, Voyageur, Eagle, Otter, Lynx, Duck, and Yellow Birch Lakes in Vilas County. It flows into Watersmeet Lake on the Wisconsin River in the town of Lincoln, approximately two miles (3 km) west of the city of Eagle River.

== See also ==
- List of rivers in Wisconsin
