= Trees For Tomorrow =

- U.S. National Register of Historic Places
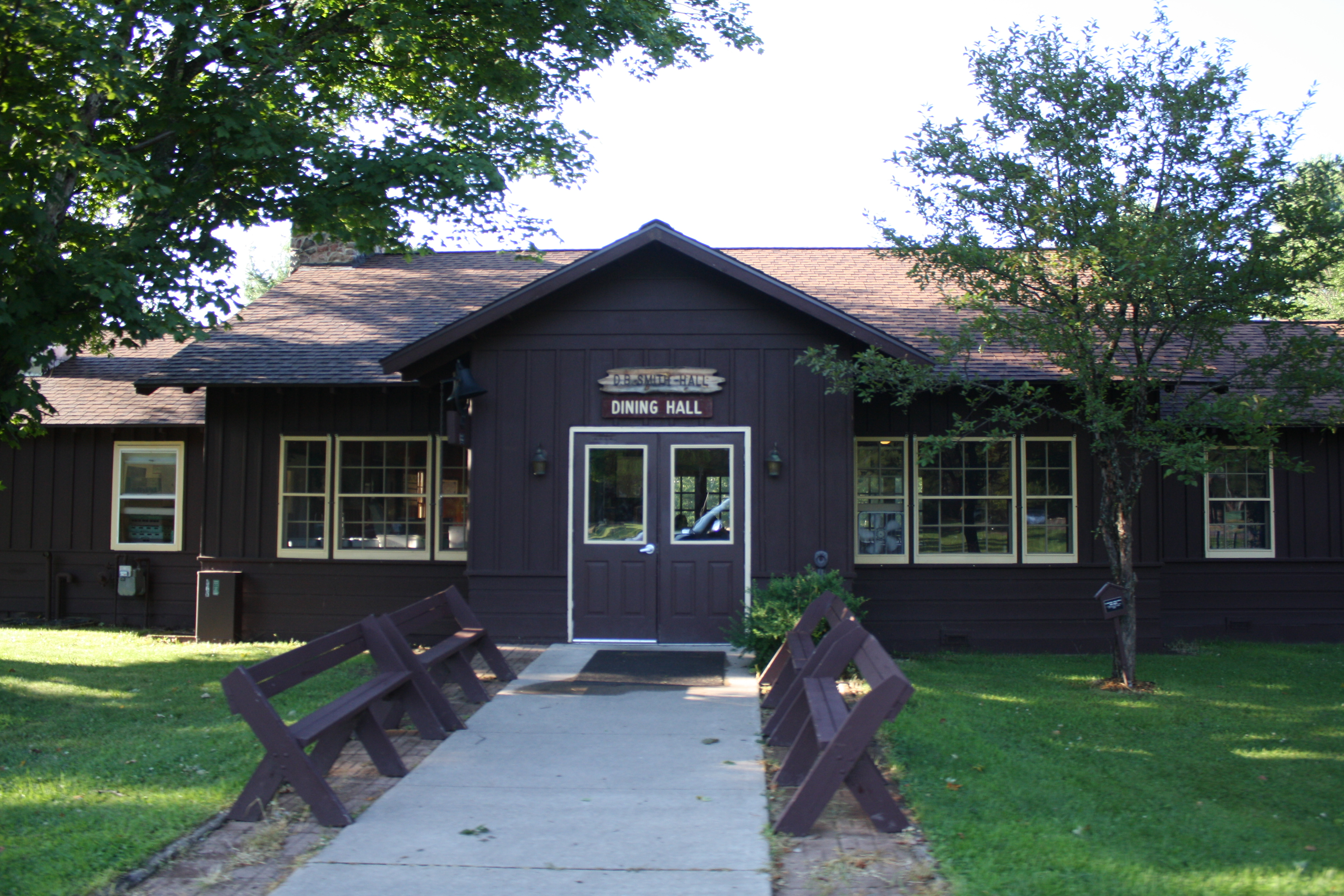
- The dining hall at Trees For Tomorrow.
- Location: 519 E. Sheridan St. Eagle River, Wisconsin
- Built: 1937
- Architectural style: Rustic
- NRHP reference No.: 96000890
- Added to NRHP: August 8, 1996

Trees For Tomorrow (TFT) is an accredited non-profit outdoor environmental education center specializing in day and overnight environmental education programs for K-12 school groups on 40-acres of woodland in Eagle River, Wisconsin. Campus facilities include dormitories, a full-service dining hall, classrooms and an Outdoor Learning Center. Trees for Tomorrow promotes sustainable natural resource management through transformative, real-life educational experiences, annually serving 14,000 youth and adults with the mission to promote sustainable management of our natural resources through transformative educational experiences.

The campus was formerly the site of the Civilian Conservation Corps (CCC) Region Nine Training School during the 1930s. In 1996 the property was added to the National Register of Historic Places for its significance in the conservation movement). Campus includes National Forest property under permit from the United States Forest Service. Private property owned by Trees For Tomorrow (TFT), the Wisconsin Newspaper Association and Tara Lila LLC are also utilized for education and outreach purposes.

== History ==
Trees For Tomorrow was originally founded in Merrill, Wisconsin, in 1944 by Melvin "Mully" Taylor as a nonprofit organization to promote reforestation. Supported by nine paper mills in the Upper Wisconsin River Valley, the organization was built around a 2-to-1 replanting pledge during World War II—ensuring that for every tree harvested to support the war effort, two would be planted in its place. This commitment laid the foundation for a long-term ethic of sustainable forest management.

At the same time, a conservation education component was developing in Eagle River. A highly successful educator workshop led Trees For Tomorrow to lease the camp in 1946 and establish a permanent environmental education center. Taylor championed a “learning through doing” philosophy and emphasized the long-term value of integrated natural resource management. This hands-on approach continues to guide the organization in the 21st century as an environmental learning center providing immersive nature-based experiences for visitors of all ages.

Taylor served as executive director for 31 years and was a catalyst for numerous conservation initiatives. In its early years, Trees For Tomorrow worked with youth to plant trees for a Rhinelander school forest and a Boy Scout camp. By 1968, more than 15 million trees had been planted on private and public lands. The organization expanded its services to include forest management plan preparation, tree planting, timber marking, timber sale setup, and other contractual forestry services for landowners across 39 counties in northern Wisconsin and Michigan’s Upper Peninsula. At the same time, Trees For Tomorrow strengthened its educational mission, developing immersive natural resource management programs for youth and educators — including career exploration initiatives such as Natural Resources Career Exploration Week (NRCEW) and School Outdoor Learning Experiences (SOLE) for K-12.

== Programs ==
Programs at Trees For Tomorrow take place year-round, with opportunities for youth and adults. Most school groups opting to come from September through May. Groups range from 15 to 90 students, elementary school through high school age, and their teachers and chaperones. The groups typically come from schools in the states of Wisconsin, Michigan and Illinois and generally stay at the campus for 4 to 6 days. In addition to its day and overnight programs, the organization offers Natural Resources Career Exploration Week (NRCEW), a career-focused program held in June, designed to introduce high school students to professions in forestry, wildlife management, conservation law enforcement, and other natural resource fields.

Trees For Tomorrow is accredited by Cognia (education) (formerly AdvancED and the North Central Association Commission on Accreditation and School Improvement).

Adult programming is offered often in partnership with various like-minded organizations. The most popular of the programs is in partnership with Road Scholar, formally Elderhostel. Participants come for a week to experience The Gems of the Northwoods. Trees For Tomorrow also partners annually with the Wisconsin Master Naturalist program, which supports a network of informed volunteers and instructors dedicated to conservation service, leadership, and lifelong learning. Additionally, collaboration with Tara Lila LLC, a local land conservation nonprofit, provides specialized Outdoor Adventures focused on specific natural resource topics, guided by TFT Environmental Educators.
