= Sunset Point (Eagle River, Wisconsin) =

Historic house in Wisconsin, United States

- U.S. National Register of Historic Places
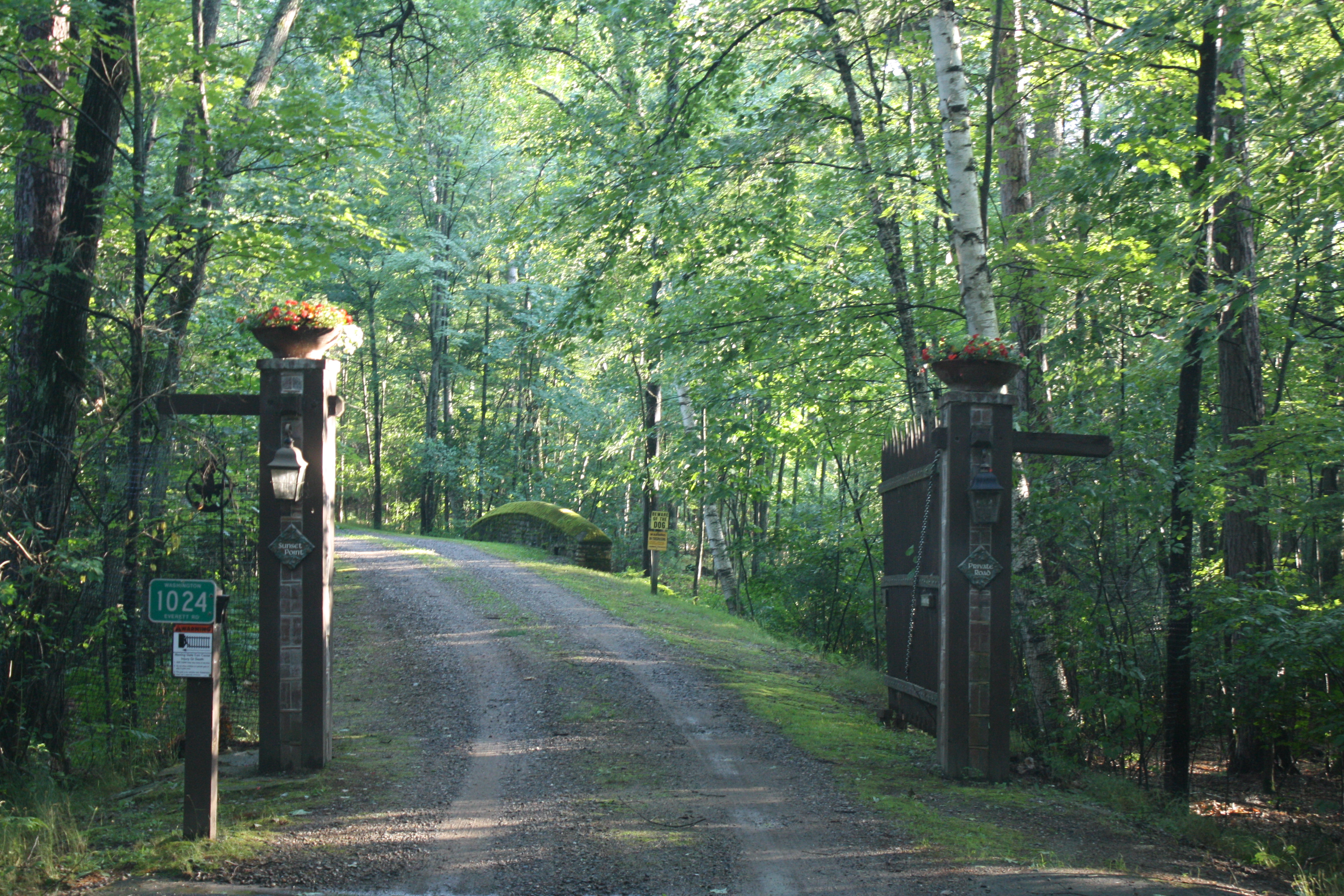
- The entrance to Sunset Point

- Location within Wisconsin Location within the United States
- Location: 1024 Everett Rd., Eagle River, Wisconsin
- Coordinates: 45°54′03″N 89°11′00″W
- Area: 11 acres (4.5 ha)
- Built: 1928
- Architect: Nedved, Rudolph; Kinball, Elizabeth
- Architectural style: Late 19th And 20th Century Revivals
- NRHP reference No.: 93001169
- Added to NRHP: November 4, 1993

Sunset Point is a historic vacation estate on Catfish Lake in Eagle River, Wisconsin. Chicago gambler Mont Tennes bought land for the estate in 1921, and after several years of planning architects Rudolph Nedved and Elizabeth Kimball designed it in 1927. The French Normandy Style estate was built in 1928; a fire burned its main house shortly before completion, causing Tennes to order it to be rebuilt within the summer using fireproof construction. The Tennes family owned Sunset Point until 1951, when they gave the property to the Sisters of Mercy. The Sisters operated a camp and retreat at the site before selling the property in 1974. The estate was privately bought and converted back to a vacation home in 1987 and was added to the National Register of Historic Places on November 4, 1993.
