= Plum Lake, Wisconsin =

- Town
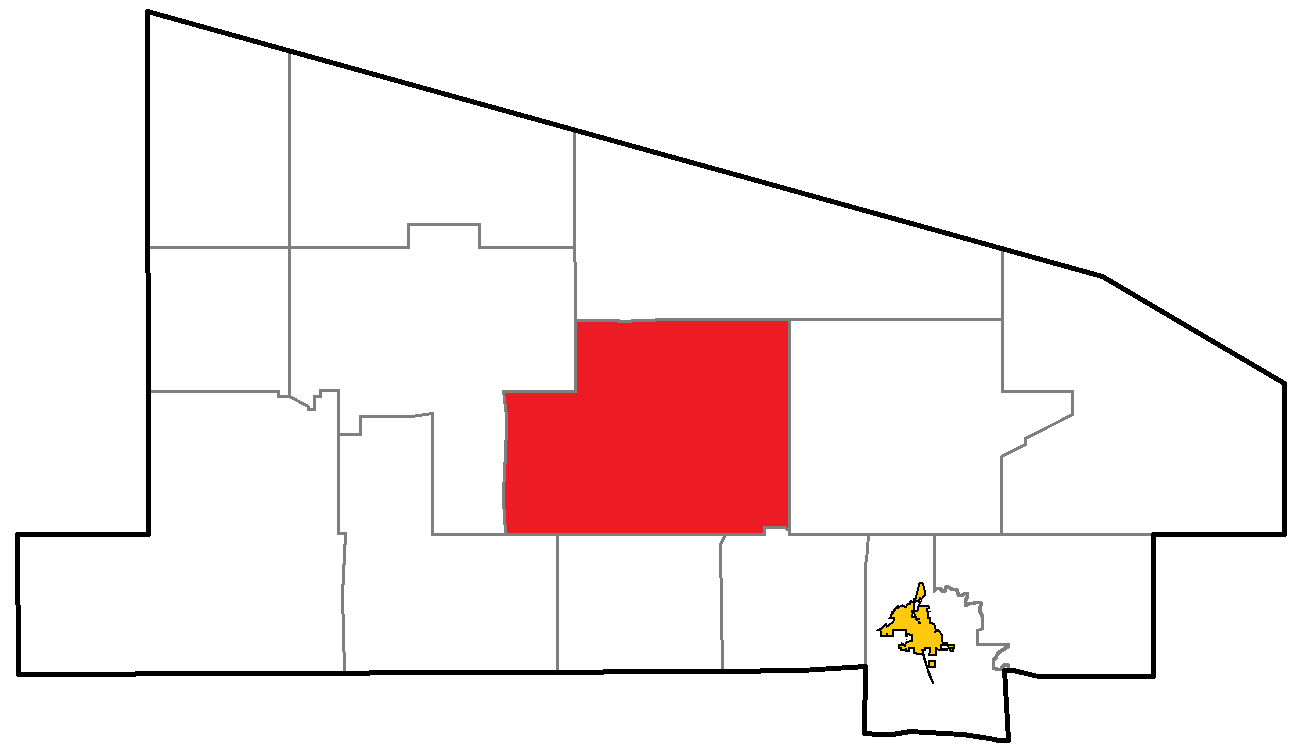
- Location of Plum Lake, within Vilas County
- Coordinates: 46°1′53″N 89°31′13″W
- Country: United States
- State: Wisconsin
- County: Vilas

Area
  - Total: 100.1 sq mi (259.2 km^{2})
  - Land: 88.9 sq mi (230.3 km^{2})
  - Water: 11.1 sq mi (28.8 km^{2})
- Elevation: 1,670 ft (510 m)

Population (2020)
  - Total: 553
  - Density: 6.22/sq mi (2.40/km^{2})
- Time zone: UTC-6 (Central (CST))
  - Summer (DST): UTC-5 (CDT)
- Area codes: 715 & 534
- FIPS code: 55-63625
- GNIS feature ID: 1583944
- Website: https://www.plumlakewi.gov/

Plum Lake is a town in Vilas County, Wisconsin, United States. The population was 553 at the 2020 census. The census-designated place of Sayner and the unincorporated community of Star Lake are located in the town.

== Demographics ==
As of the census of 2000, there were 486 people, 221 households, and 156 families residing in the town. The population density was 5.5 people per square mile (2.1/km^{2}). There were 762 housing units at an average density of 8.6 per square mile (3.3/km^{2}). The racial makeup of the town was 98.35% White, and 1.65% from two or more races.

There were 221 households, out of which 21.7% had children under the age of 18 living with them, 61.1% were married couples living together, 5.4% had a female householder with no husband present, and 29.4% were non-families. 27.6% of all households were made up of individuals, and 12.7% had someone living alone who was 65 years of age or older. The average household size was 2.20 and the average family size was 2.65.

In terms of age the population of the town was spread out, with 19.8% under the age of 18, 2.7% from 18 to 24, 21.4% from 25 to 44, 33.5% from 45 to 64, and 22.6% who were 65 years of age or older. The median age was 48 years. For every 100 females, there were 100.0 males. For every 100 females age 18 and over, there were 98.0 males.

The median income for a household in the town was $33,529, and the median income for a family was $39,519. Males had a median income of $30,795 versus $20,000 for females. The per capita income for the town was $17,824. About 6.8% of families and 7.7% of the population were below the poverty line, including 7.6% of those under age 18 and 11.3% of those age 65 or over.

== Geography ==
The Town of Plum Lake is located in central Vilas County. Much of the town is made up of Vilas County Forest lands or Northern Highland-American Legion State Forest. According to the United States Census Bureau, the town has a total area of 100.1 square miles (259.2 km^{2}), of which 88.9 square miles (230.3 km^{2}) is land and 11.1 square miles (28.8 km^{2}) (11.12%) is water.

== Transportation ==
Plum Lake is served by one Wisconsin State Highway and several Vilas County Trunk Highways. Sayner is connected to the rest of the Wisconsin Highway System via STH 155 which runs south to a junction with STH 70 in St. Germain. CTH N runs in two distinct sections through the town. The western section runs west from Sayner serving Northern Highland-American Legion State Forest campgrounds and recreation areas at Crystal Lake, Plum Lake, and Firefly Lake before meeting CTH M and eventually USH 51. This section is often used as a through route for travellers crossing Vilas County as an alternative to STH 70. The eastern section connects Sayner and Star Lake via CTH K, and provides a connection to CTH G and Eagle River. CTH K runs east–west through the town serving the Star Lake area. To the east it runs through mostly Vilas County forest lands to Conover, and to the west CTH K is a Rustic Road between its junction with CTH N and Boulder Junction.
