= Sayner, Wisconsin =

Census-designated place in Wisconsin, United States

- Census-designated place
- Location within Wisconsin
- Coordinates: 45°59′10″N 89°31′58″W
- Country: United States
- State: Wisconsin
- County: Vilas

Area
  - Total: 1.828 sq mi (4.73 km^{2})
  - Land: 1.826 sq mi (4.73 km^{2})
  - Water: 0.002 sq mi (0.0052 km^{2})
- Elevation: 1,670 ft (510 m)

Population (2010)
  - Total: 207
  - Density: 113/sq mi (43.8/km^{2})
- Time zone: UTC-6 (Central (CST))
  - Summer (DST): UTC-5 (CDT)
- Area codes: 715 & 534
- GNIS feature ID: 1573765

Sayner is a census-designated place in the Town of Plum Lake in Vilas County, Wisconsin, United States. It is located at the intersection of Highway 155 and County N, about 15 miles northwest of Eagle River. As of the 2020 census, Sayner had a population of 231. Sayner has an area of 1.828 square miles (4.73 km^{2}); 1.826 square miles (4.73 km^{2}) of this is land, and 0.002 square miles (0.0052 km^{2}) is water. Sayner got its name from Orrin W. Sayner, who settled the area in 1891, two years before any other settlers took up homes in the town. In 1895, the Milwaukee Road extended its Valley Line north from Woodruff to Star Lake, with a stop in Sayner. The line primarily carried lumber from area forests, later carried tourists and had been abandoned in the middle 20th century.

Sayner is home to the Vilas County Historical Society.

The community is the birthplace of the snowmobile, with the first "motor toboggan" built by Carl Eliason in 1924.

Sayner is also home to one of the nation's oldest summer camps, Camp Highlands for Boys, founded in 1904, and located on the northeast end of Plum Lake.

Located on the south shore of Plum Lake, the Plum Lake Golf Course is the oldest nine-hole golf course in Wisconsin, founded in 1912.

== See also ==
- List of census-designated places in Wisconsin
