= St. Germain (community), Wisconsin =

St. Germain, Wisconsin
- Unincorporated community
- Location within Wisconsin Location within the United States
- Coordinates: 45°54′06″N 89°29′15″W
- Country: United States
- State: Wisconsin
- County: Vilas
- Elevation: 1,631 ft (497 m)
- Time zone: UTC-6 (Central (CST))
  - Summer (DST): UTC-5 (CDT)
- ZIP code: 54558
- Area codes: 715 & 534
- GNIS feature ID: 1572952

St. Germain is an unincorporated community located in the town of St. Germain, Vilas County, Wisconsin, United States. St. Germain is located at the junction of state highways 70 and 155, 11.5 miles (18.5 km) west of Eagle River. St. Germain has a post office with ZIP code 54558.
