= Vilas County, Wisconsin =

County in Wisconsin, United States

- County
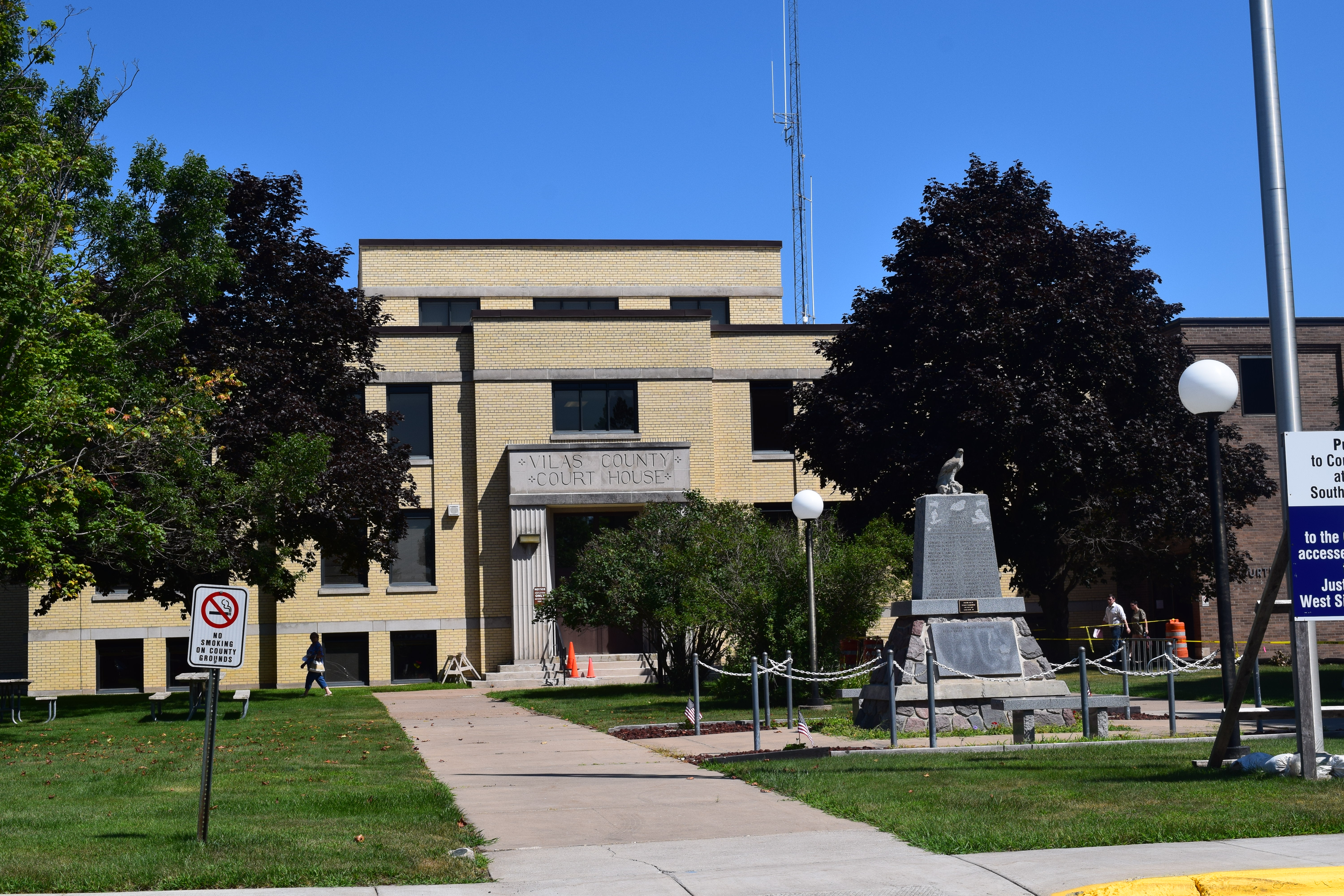
- Vilas County Courthouse

- Location within the U.S. state of Wisconsin
- Coordinates: 46°03′N 89°31′W
- Country: United States
- State: Wisconsin
- Founded: April 12, 1893
- Named for: William Freeman Vilas
- Seat: Eagle River
- Largest city: Eagle River

Area
  - Total: 1,018 sq mi (2,640 km^{2})
  - Land: 857 sq mi (2,220 km^{2})
  - Water: 161 sq mi (420 km^{2}) 16%

Population (2020)
  - Total: 23,047
  - Estimate (2025): 23,761 ▲
  - Density: 26.9/sq mi (10.4/km^{2})
- Time zone: UTC−6 (Central)
  - Summer (DST): UTC−5 (CDT)
- Congressional district: 7th
- Website: www.vilascountywi.gov

Vilas County (/ˈvaɪləs/ VYE-ləss) is a county in the state of Wisconsin, United States. As of the 2020 census, the population was 23,047. Its county seat is Eagle River. The county partly overlaps the reservation of the Lac du Flambeau Band of Lake Superior Chippewa. The county is considered a high-recreation retirement destination by the U.S. Department of Agriculture.

== History ==
=== Native Americans ===
Native Americans have lived in what is now Vilas County for thousands of years. The county contains archaeological sites dating to the prehistoric Woodland period. In the eighteenth century, the area was disputed by the Dakota and Ojibwe people. According to oral histories, the conflict culminated in Ojibwe victory in a battle on Strawberry Island in Flambeau Lake around 1745. Ojibwe people have continued to live in the area ever since, securing the Lac du Flambeau Indian Reservation in the 1854 Treaty of La Pointe.

=== Settlement ===
The first recorded white settler was a man named Ashman who established a trading post in Lac du Flambeau in 1818.

In the 1850s migrants from New England, primarily from Vermont and Connecticut, constructed wagon roads and trails through Vilas County including the Ontonagan Mail Trail and a military road from Fort Howard to Fort Wilkins in Copper Harbor, Michigan.

Vilas County was set off from Oneida County on April 12, 1893, and named for William Freeman Vilas. Originally from Vermont, Vilas represented Wisconsin in the United States Senate from 1891 to 1897.

=== Logging era ===
Logging began in the late 1850s. Loggers came from Cortland County, New York, Carroll County, New Hampshire, Orange County, Vermont and Down East Maine in what is now Washington County, Maine and Hancock County, Maine. Many dams were built throughout the county to assist loggers as they sent their timber downstream to the lumber and paper mills in the Wisconsin River valley. After the county was founded in 1893 and logging ceased to be the primary industry in the area, migrants seeking other forms of employment settled in the county. These later immigrants primarily came from Germany, Ireland and Poland though some came from other parts of the United States as well.

== Geography ==
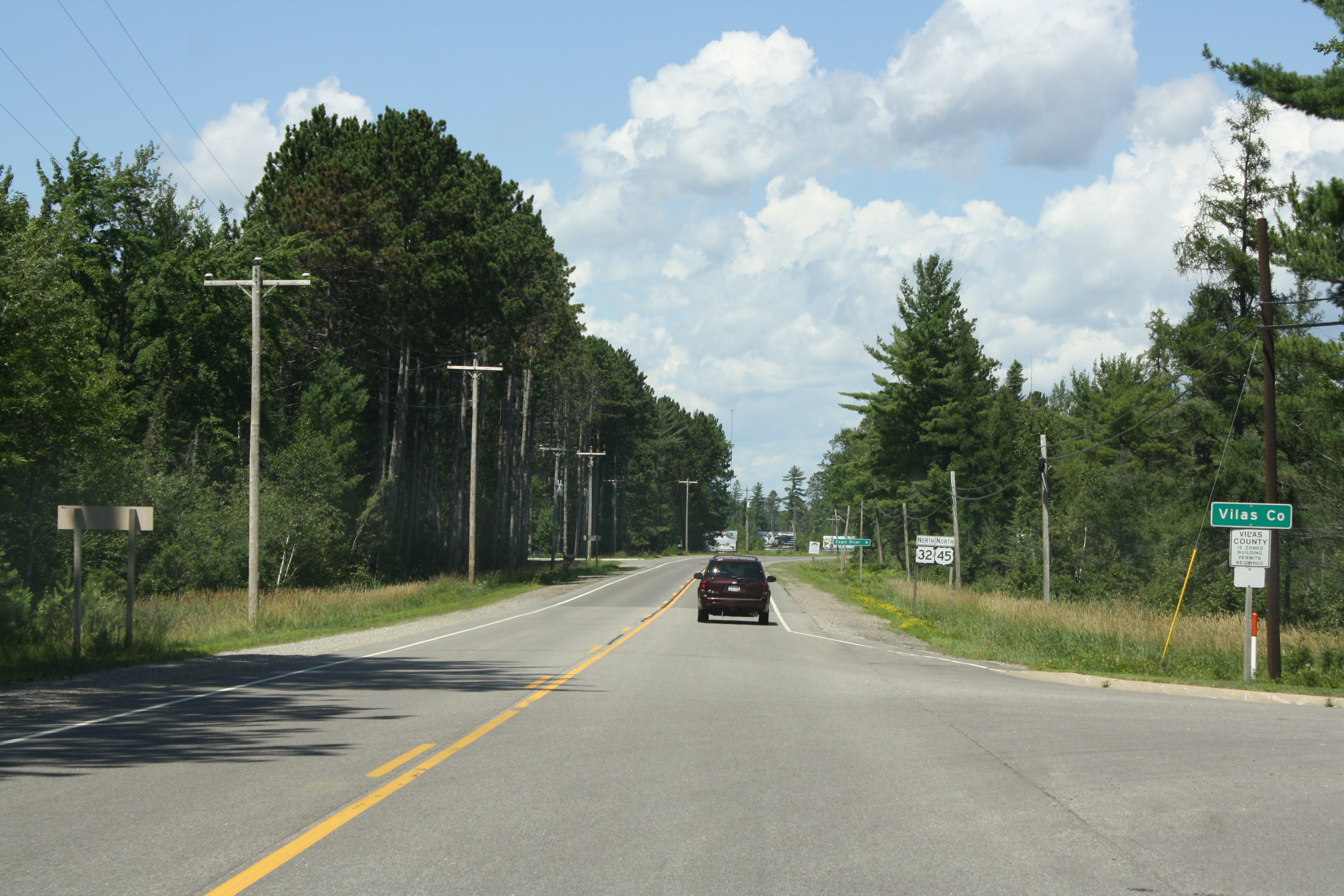
Sign for Vilas County on U.S. Route 45

According to the U.S. Census Bureau, the county has a total area of 1,018 square miles (2,640 km^{2}), of which 857 square miles (2,220 km^{2}) is land and 161 square miles (420 km^{2}) (16%) is water. There are 1,318 lakes in the county. Much of Vilas County is covered by the Chequamegon-Nicolet National Forest and the Northern Highland-American Legion State Forest as well as extensive county forest lands. Vilas County waters drain to Lake Superior, Lake Michigan, and the Mississippi River. The Wisconsin, Flambeau, and Presque Isle Rivers all find their headwaters in Vilas County.

=== Adjacent counties ===
- Forest County – southeast
- Iron County – west
- Oneida County – south
- Price County – southwest
- Gogebic County, Michigan – north
- Iron County, Michigan – northeast

=== Major highways ===
- U.S. Highway 45
- U.S. Highway 51
- Highway 17 (Wisconsin)
- Highway 32 (Wisconsin)
- Highway 47 (Wisconsin)
- Highway 70 (Wisconsin)
- Highway 155 (Wisconsin)

=== Airports ===
- KARV – Lakeland Airport / Noble F. Lee Memorial Field
- KEGV – Eagle River Union Airport
- KLNL – Kings Land O' Lakes Airport
- D25 – Manitowish Waters Airport

=== National protected areas ===
- Chequamegon National Forest (part)
- Nicolet National Forest (part)

Although these two forests have been administratively combined into the Chequamegon-Nicolet National Forest, the county contains portions of both original forests.

== Demographics ==
Historical population
Census	Pop.	Note	%±
1900	4,929		—
1910	6,019		22.1%
1920	5,649		−6.1%
1930	7,294		29.1%
1940	8,894		21.9%
1950	9,363		5.3%
1960	9,332		−0.3%
1970	10,958		17.4%
1980	16,535		50.9%
1990	17,707		7.1%
2000	21,033		18.8%
2010	21,430		1.9%
2020	23,047		7.5%
2025 (est.)	23,761	▲	3.1%
U.S. Decennial Census; 1790–1960 1900–1990; 1990–2000 2010 2020

=== Racial and ethnic composition ===
Vilas County, Wisconsin – Racial and ethnic composition Note: the US Census treats Hispanic/Latino as an ethnic category. This table excludes Latinos from the racial categories and assigns them to a separate category. Hispanics/Latinos may be of any race.
Race / ethnicity (NH = Non-Hispanic)	Pop 1980	Pop 1990	Pop 2000	Pop 2010	Pop 2020	% 1980	% 1990	% 2000	% 2010	% 2020
White alone (NH)	15,295	16,073	18,765	18,546	19,569	92.50%	90.77%	89.22%	86.54%	84.91%
Black or African American alone (NH)	4	9	42	31	49	0.02%	0.05%	0.20%	0.14%	0.21%
Native American or Alaska Native alone (NH)	1,181	1,528	1,876	2,290	2,181	7.14%	8.63%	8.92%	10.69%	9.46%
Asian alone (NH)	17	35	37	61	57	0.10%	0.20%	0.18%	0.28%	0.25%
Native Hawaiian or Pacific Islander alone (NH)	x	x	2	1	0	x	x	0.01%	0.00%	0.00%
Other race alone (NH)	0	1	9	3	61	0.00%	0.01%	0.04%	0.01%	0.26%
Mixed race or Multiracial (NH)	x	x	121	230	671	x	x	0.58%	1.07%	2.91%
Hispanic or Latino (any race)	38	61	181	268	459	0.23%	0.34%	0.86%	1.25%	1.99%
Total	16,535	17,707	21,033	21,430	23,047	100.00%	100.00%	100.00%	100.00%	100.00%

=== 2020 census ===
As of the 2020 census, the population was 23,047, and the population density was 26.9 people per square mile (10.4 people/km^{2}). There were 24,486 housing units at an average density of 28.5 units per square mile (11.0 units/km^{2}).

The median age was 56.8 years. 15.6% of residents were under the age of 18 and 33.7% of residents were 65 years of age or older. For every 100 females there were 103.2 males, and for every 100 females age 18 and over there were 101.7 males age 18 and over.

The racial makeup of the county was 85.5% White, 0.3% Black or African American, 9.8% American Indian and Alaska Native, 0.3% Asian, <0.1% Native Hawaiian and Pacific Islander, 0.5% from some other race, and 3.7% from two or more races. Hispanic or Latino residents of any race comprised 2.0% of the population.

<0.1% of residents lived in urban areas, while 100.0% lived in rural areas.

There were 10,804 households in the county, of which 17.5% had children under the age of 18 living in them. Of all households, 50.6% were married-couple households, 20.8% were households with a male householder and no spouse or partner present, and 21.6% were households with a female householder and no spouse or partner present. About 31.8% of all households were made up of individuals and 17.5% had someone living alone who was 65 years of age or older.

There were 24,486 housing units, of which 55.9% were vacant. Among occupied housing units, 81.1% were owner-occupied and 18.9% were renter-occupied. The homeowner vacancy rate was 2.2% and the rental vacancy rate was 9.2%.

=== 2000 census ===
2000 Census Age Pyramid for Vilas County

As of the census of 2000, there were 21,033 people, 9,066 households, and 6,300 families residing in the county. The population density was 24 people per square mile (9.3 people/km^{2}). There were 22,397 housing units at an average density of 26 units per square mile (10 units/km^{2}). The racial makeup of the county was 89.69% White, 0.20% Black or African American, 9.08% Native American, 0.18% Asian, 0.01% Pacific Islander, 0.19% from other races, and 0.65% from two or more races. 0.86% of the population were Hispanic or Latino of any race. 37.8% were of German, 7.9% Polish, 6.6% Irish and 5.3% English ancestry. 95.9% spoke English, 1.3% Spanish and 1.2% German as their first language.

There were 9,066 households, out of which 23.40% had children under the age of 18 living with them, 58.40% were married couples living together, 7.50% had a female householder with no husband present, and 30.50% were non-families. 26.00% of all households were made up of individuals, and 12.60% had someone living alone who was 65 years of age or older. The average household size was 2.29 and the average family size was 2.73.

In the county, the population was spread out, with 20.70% under the age of 18, 5.00% from 18 to 24, 23.10% from 25 to 44, 28.50% from 45 to 64, and 22.80% who were 65 years of age or older. The median age was 46 years. For every 100 females there were 99.10 males. For every 100 females age 18 and over, there were 95.80 males.

In 2017, there were 186 births, giving a general fertility rate of 74.9 births per 1000 women aged 15–44, the 7th highest rate out of all 72 Wisconsin counties. Additionally, there were twelve reported induced abortions performed on women of Vilas County residence in 2017.

== Economy ==
The economy in Vilas County is based on tourism centered on its high concentration of lakes and forests. Hunting and sport fishing are the backbones of the fall economy, and ice fishing and especially snowmobiling makes up the bulk of the economy in the wintertime. Logging, forestry, construction and government also account for important parts of the local economy.

== Municipalities ==
The municipalities with their population within Vilas County and their total population as of the 2010 Census, are:

=== City ===
- Eagle River – 1,628 (county seat)

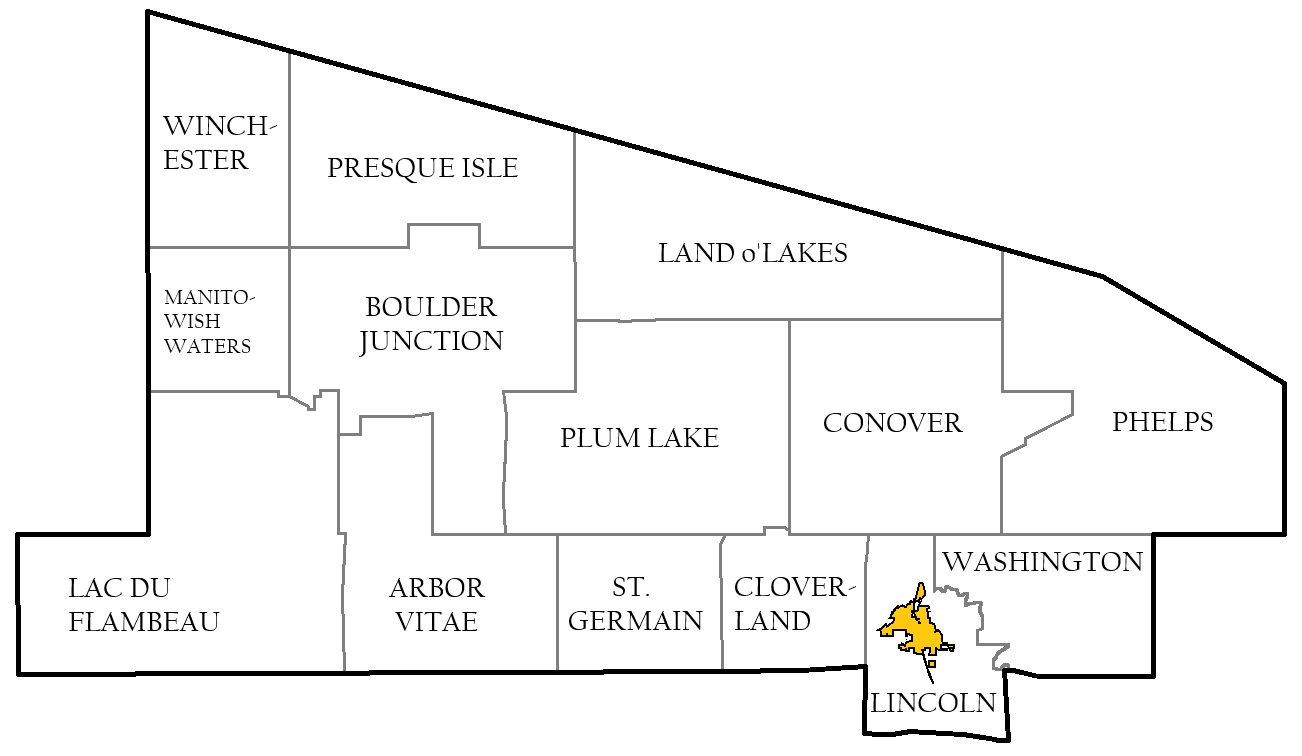
Towns of Vilas County

=== Towns ===
- Arbor Vitae – 3,403
- Boulder Junction – 1,057
- Cloverland – 1,068
- Conover – 1,318
- Lac du Flambeau – 3,552
- Land O' Lakes – 944
- Lincoln – 2,659
- Manitowish Waters – 624
- Phelps – 1,238
- Plum Lake – 553
- Presque Isle – 805
- St. Germain – 2,083
- Washington – 1,587
- Winchester – 528

=== Census-designated places ===
- Boulder Junction – 179
- Lac du Flambeau – 1,845
- Sayner – 231

=== Other unincorporated communities ===
- Arbor Vitae
- Conover
- Katinka Village
- Land O' Lakes
- Manitowish Waters
- Marlands
- Phelps
- Presque Isle
- St. Germain
- Star Lake
- Winchester

== Notable people ==
- Herman Finger was the Treasurer of Vilas County in the 1890s while also co-owning and operating Gerry Lumber Company in the county
- Screenwriter Winifred Dunn was born in Vilas County.

== Politics ==
United States presidential election results for Vilas County, Wisconsin
Year	Republican		Democratic		Third party(ies)	
Year	No.	%	No.	%	No.	%
1896	754	62.01%	443	36.43%	19	1.56%
1900	1,208	69.27%	488	27.98%	48	2.75%
1904	1,467	79.08%	322	17.36%	66	3.56%
1908	794	71.73%	278	25.11%	35	3.16%
1912	304	32.94%	327	35.43%	292	31.64%
1916	531	48.45%	467	42.61%	98	8.94%
1920	903	66.06%	255	18.65%	209	15.29%
1924	873	42.11%	119	5.74%	1,081	52.15%
1928	1,609	58.45%	1,083	39.34%	61	2.22%
1932	1,138	34.29%	2,036	61.34%	145	4.37%
1936	1,298	31.31%	2,559	61.74%	288	6.95%
1940	2,251	46.92%	2,470	51.48%	77	1.60%
1944	2,021	48.91%	2,079	50.31%	32	0.77%
1948	2,665	58.30%	1,688	36.93%	218	4.77%
1952	3,687	70.85%	1,497	28.77%	20	0.38%
1956	3,683	74.07%	1,267	25.48%	22	0.44%
1960	3,508	64.25%	1,942	35.57%	10	0.18%
1964	2,827	49.78%	2,841	50.03%	11	0.19%
1968	3,339	58.12%	1,798	31.30%	608	10.58%
1972	4,422	65.92%	1,907	28.43%	379	5.65%
1976	4,929	59.30%	3,209	38.61%	174	2.09%
1980	6,034	60.80%	3,293	33.18%	597	6.02%
1984	5,965	66.09%	2,940	32.57%	121	1.34%
1988	5,842	60.09%	3,781	38.89%	99	1.02%
1992	4,616	40.99%	3,764	33.42%	2,882	25.59%
1996	4,496	43.04%	4,226	40.46%	1,723	16.50%
2000	6,958	56.47%	4,706	38.19%	658	5.34%
2004	8,155	58.24%	5,713	40.80%	134	0.96%
2008	7,055	51.31%	6,491	47.21%	204	1.48%
2012	7,749	55.98%	5,951	42.99%	142	1.03%
2016	8,166	60.00%	4,770	35.05%	675	4.96%
2020	9,261	60.26%	5,903	38.41%	205	1.33%
2024	9,837	60.97%	6,119	37.92%	179	1.11%

Vilas County has long been one of the most consistently Republican counties in Wisconsin. Since 1944, the county has only once voted Democrat, supporting Lyndon B. Johnson in his nationwide landslide of 1964, and even then, Johnson won by just 14 votes and 0.25% in the county.

== Images ==
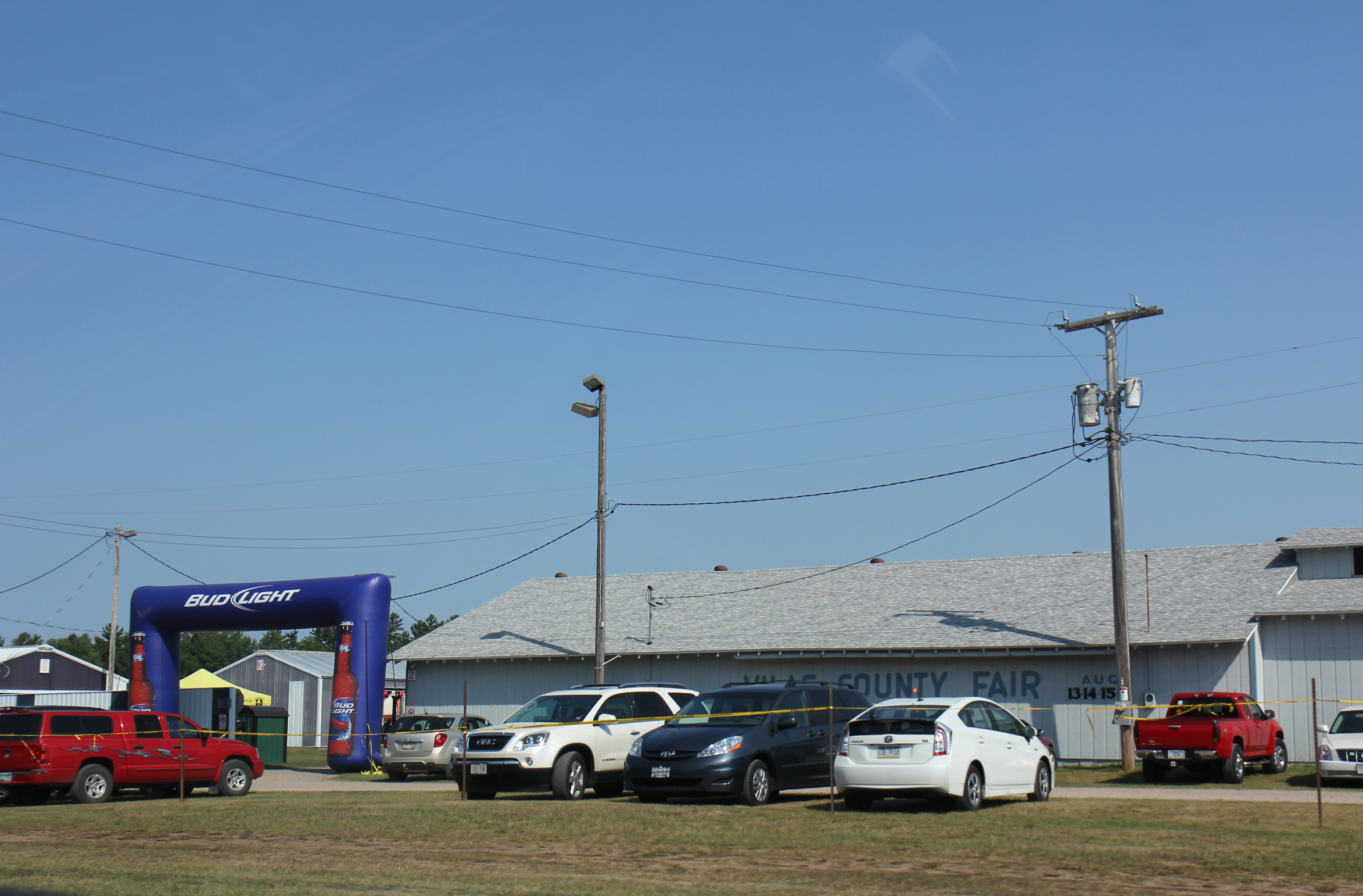
Cars parked by the entrance to the Vilas County Fairgrounds during the 2015 fair

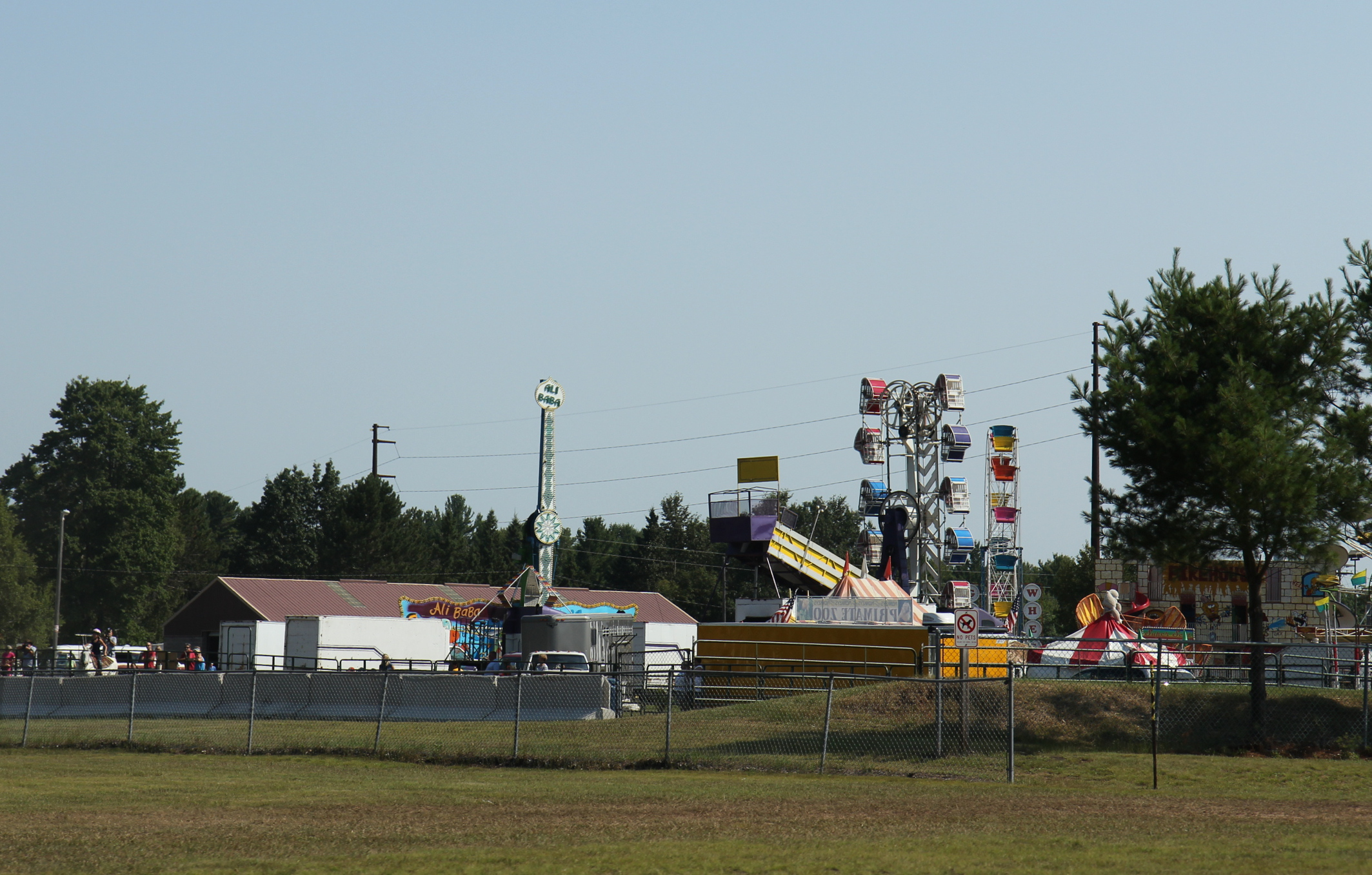
Rides during the 2015 county fair

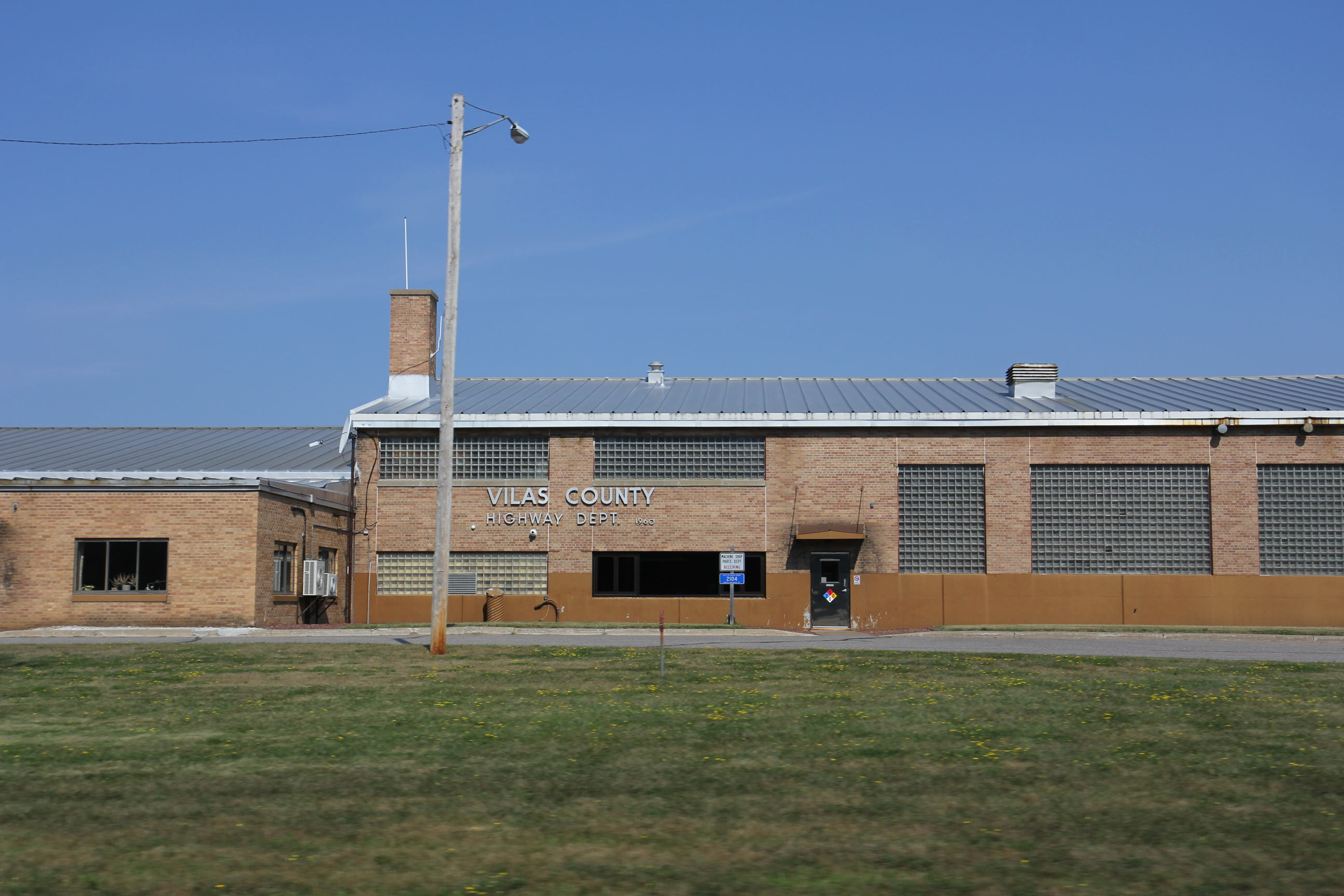
The Vilas County Highway Department near Eagle River

== See also ==
- National Register of Historic Places listings in Vilas County, Wisconsin
