= Washington, Vilas County, Wisconsin =

Washington, Wisconsin
- Town
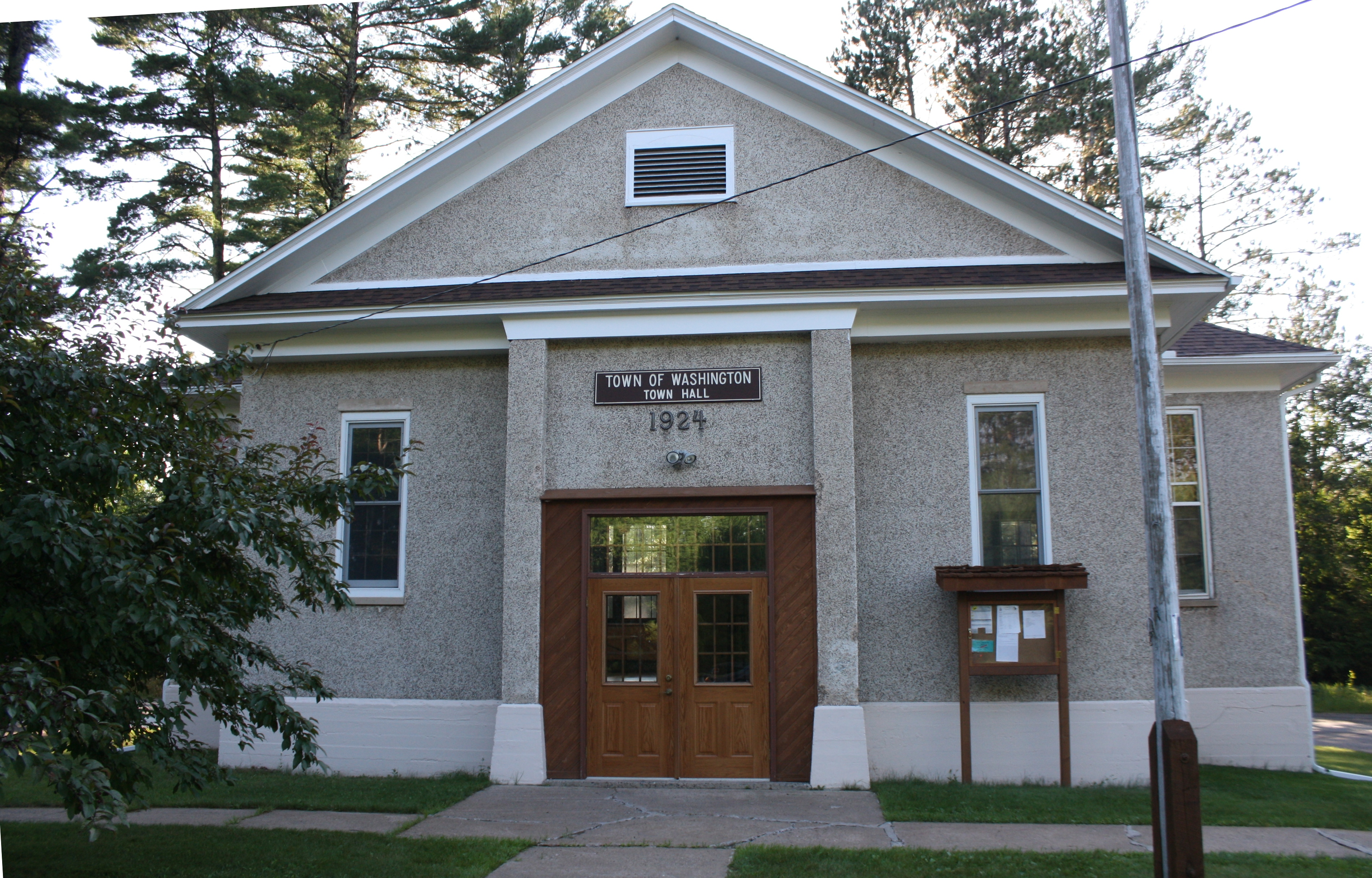
- Town hall

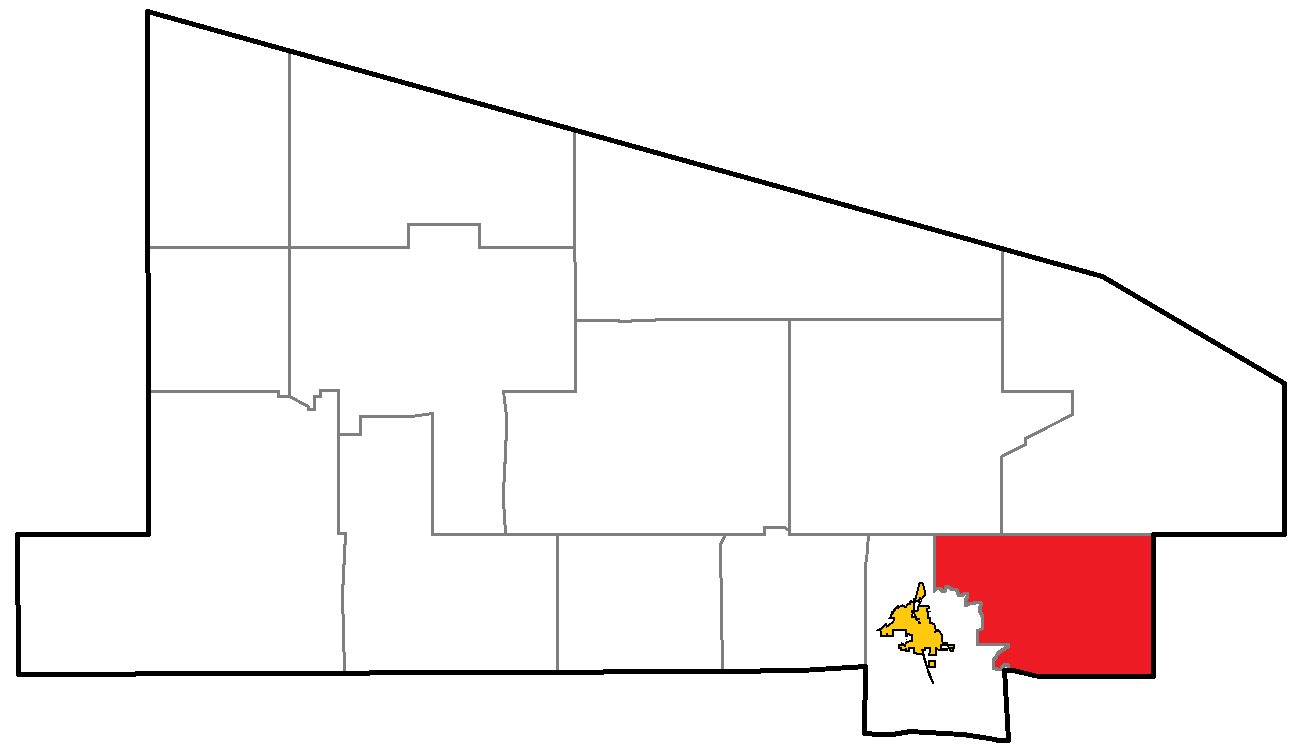
- Location of Washington, within Vilas County
- Coordinates: 45°56′8″N 89°9′12″W
- Country: United States
- State: Wisconsin
- County: Vilas

Area
  - Total: 47.6 sq mi (123.2 km^{2})
  - Land: 41.4 sq mi (107.2 km^{2})
  - Water: 6.1 sq mi (15.9 km^{2})
- Elevation: 1,657 ft (505 m)

Population (2020)
  - Total: 1,587
  - Density: 38.34/sq mi (14.80/km^{2})
- Time zone: UTC-6 (Central (CST))
  - Summer (DST): UTC-5 (CDT)
- Area codes: 715 & 534
- FIPS code: 55-83750
- GNIS feature ID: 1584359
- Website: https://town-of-washington.org/

Washington is a town in Vilas County, Wisconsin, United States. The population was 1,587 at the 2020 census.

== Geography ==
According to the United States Census Bureau, the town has a total area of 47.5 square miles (123.2 km^{2}), of which 41.4 square miles (107.2 km^{2}) is land and 6.2 square miles (15.9 km^{2}) (12.93%) is water.

== Demographics ==
As of the census of 2000, there were 1,577 people, 683 households, and 491 families residing in the town. The population density was 38.1 people per square mile (14.7/km^{2}). There were 1,706 housing units at an average density of 41.2 per square mile (15.9/km^{2}). The racial makeup of the town was 98.67% White, 0.19% African American, 0.38% Native American, 0.06% Asian, and 0.70% from two or more races. Hispanic or Latino of any race were 0.32% of the population.

There were 683 households, out of which 24.7% had children under the age of 18 living with them, 63.4% were married couples living together, 5.6% had a female householder with no husband present, and 28.0% were non-families. 23.3% of all households were made up of individuals, and 8.8% had someone living alone who was 65 years of age or older. The average household size was 2.31 and the average family size was 2.71.

In the town, the population was spread out, with 20.4% under the age of 18, 4.8% from 18 to 24, 23.9% from 25 to 44, 31.4% from 45 to 64, and 19.6% who were 65 years of age or older. The median age was 45 years. For every 100 females, there were 101.4 males. For every 100 females age 18 and over, there were 104.6 males.

The median income for a household in the town was $34,961, and the median income for a family was $39,211. Males had a median income of $31,250 versus $22,574 for females. The per capita income for the town was $18,544. About 3.2% of families and 5.7% of the population were below the poverty line, including 4.7% of those under age 18 and 8.1% of those age 65 or over.
