= Eagle River, Wisconsin =

- City
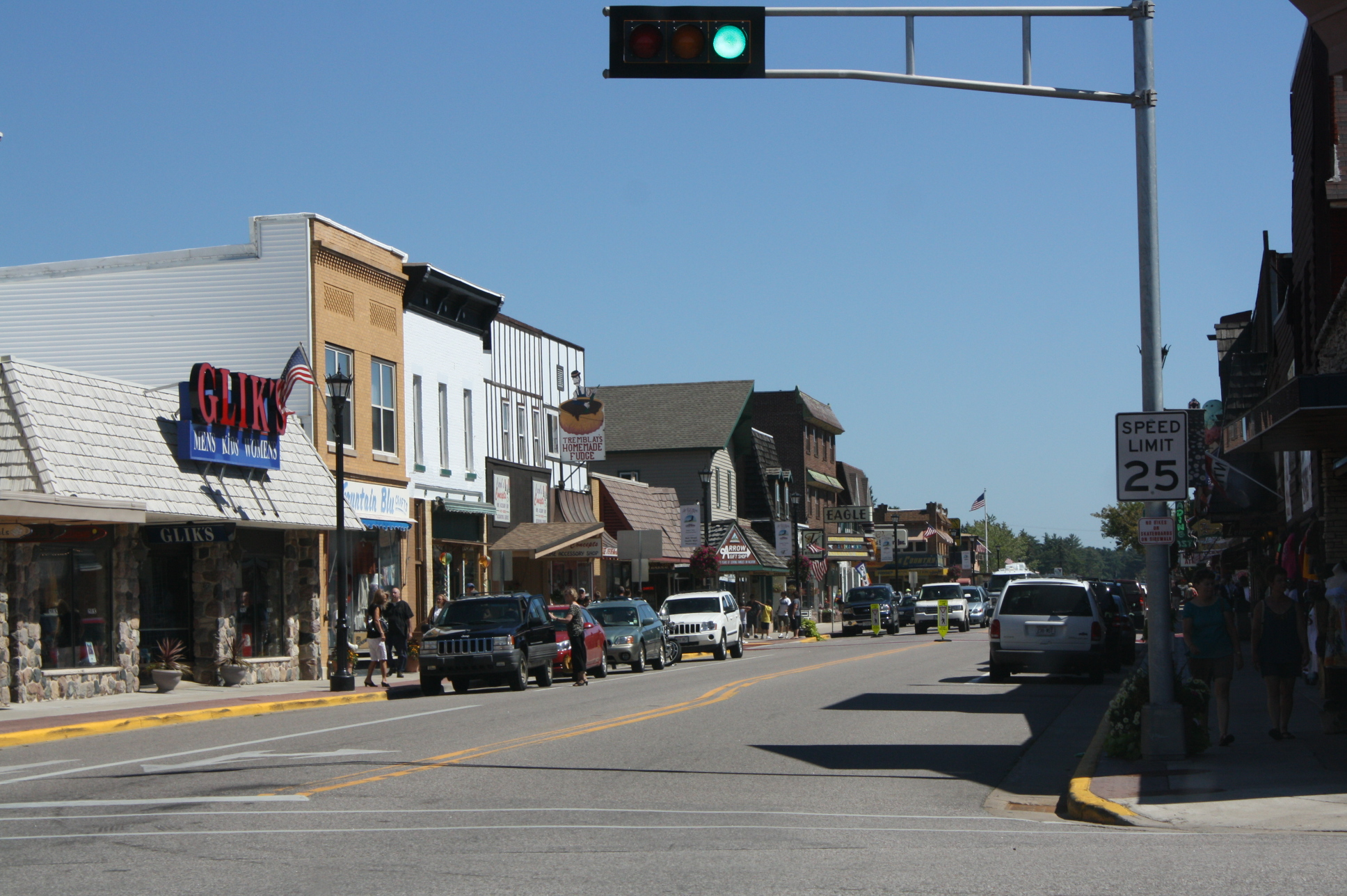
- Downtown Eagle River
- Interactive map of Eagle River, Wisconsin
- Location within Wisconsin Location within the United States
- Coordinates: 45°55′12″N 89°15′1″W
- Country: United States
- State: Wisconsin
- County: Vilas

Government
  - Mayor: Jeffrey A. Hyslop

Area
  - Total: 3.41 sq mi (8.84 km^{2})
  - Land: 3.24 sq mi (8.40 km^{2})
  - Water: 0.17 sq mi (0.44 km^{2})
- Elevation: 1,647 ft (502 m)

Population (2020)
  - Total: 1,628
  - Density: 490.9/sq mi (189.53/km^{2})
- Time zone: UTC-6 (Central (CST))
  - Summer (DST): UTC-5 (CDT)
- Zip Code: 54521
- Area codes: 715 & 534
- FIPS code: 55-21625
- GNIS feature ID: 1579167
- Website: eagleriverwi.gov

Eagle River is a city in and the county seat of Vilas County, Wisconsin, United States. The population was 1,628 at the 2020 census. Because of the many lakes in the area, the city is a popular vacation and retirement destination. The area contains many condominiums, seasonal vacation homes, and hunting cabins.

== History ==
Eagle River was the site of the first permanent Native American settlement in the Wisconsin Northwoods, located on the shores of Watersmeet Lake where the Wisconsin River and Chain O' Lakes meet. These early Natives, who were called Old Copper Indians, were succeeded by the Woodland Indians from 2,600 B.C. to 800 A.D. These Natives were probably the ancestors of the Chippewa, Potawatomi, and Menominee.

The first recorded white settler in what became Vilas County was a man named Ashman who established a trading post in Lac du Flambeau in 1818. Eagle River's name was derived from the abundance of eagles nesting along the river. It is believed that Bethuel Draper and "Dutch Pete" Cramer camped in the area in 1853 and were responsible for naming the community. A settlement grew as other families settled in the area in 1857. The town of Eagle River was created by an act of the state legislature in 1885. Vilas County was set off from Oneida County on April 12, 1893, and named for William Freeman Vilas, a migrant from Vermont. Vilas had served for Wisconsin in the United States Senate from 1891 to 1897. In the 1850s migrants from New England, primarily from Vermont and Connecticut, constructed a number of wagon roads and trails through Vilas County including the Ontonogan Mail Trail and a Military Road from Fort Howard to Fort Wilkins in Copper Harbor, Michigan.

== Geography ==
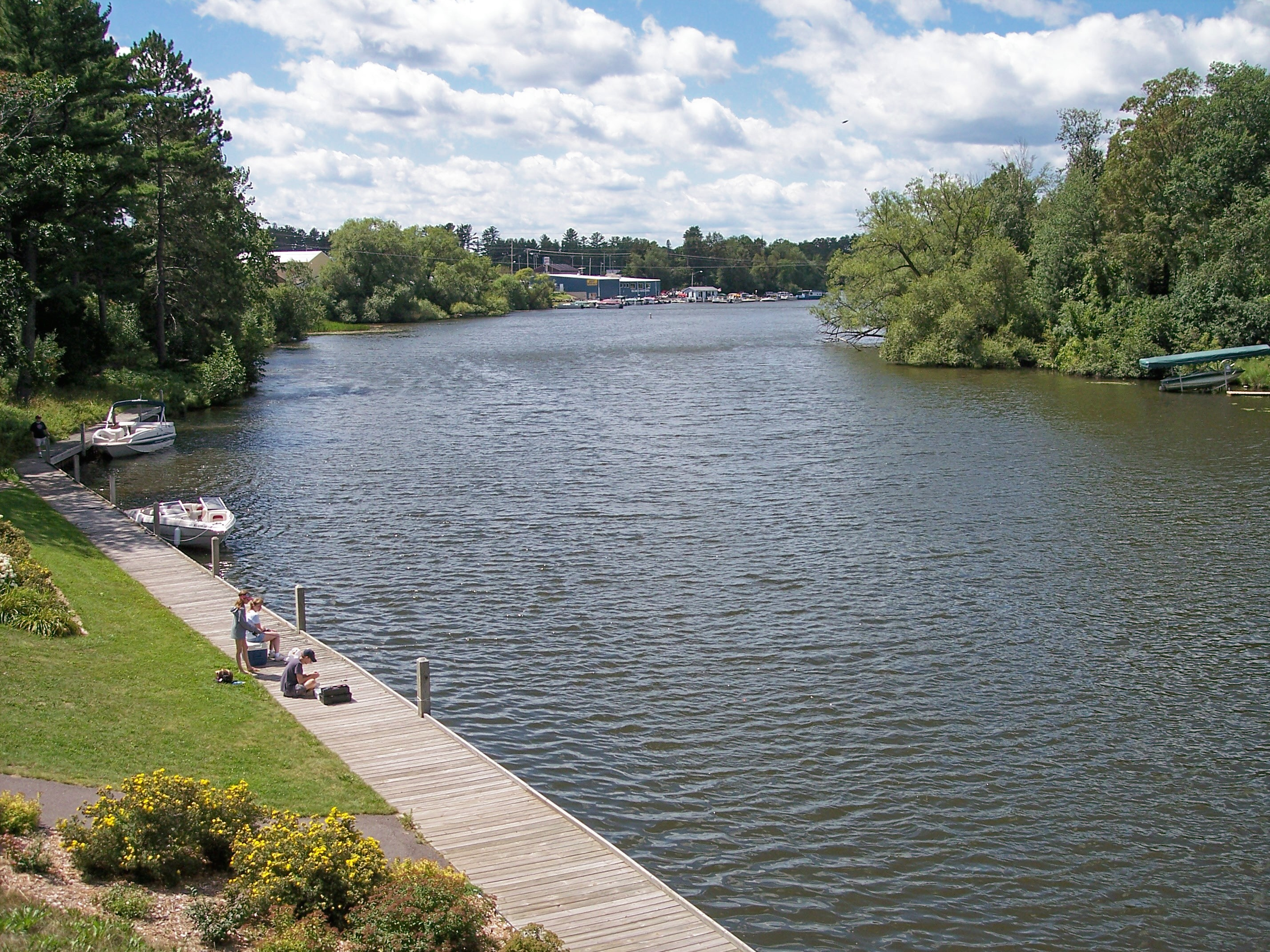
The Eagle River, which the city is named after, is a tributary of the Wisconsin River.

Eagle River is located in southeastern Vilas County at 45°55′12″N 89°15′1″W (45.919902, -89.250210), along the Eagle River, which is part of a popular chain of lakes. The Eagle River/Three Lakes Chain of Lakes is made up of 28 lakes, which is the largest number of inland interconnecting lakes in the world.

According to the United States Census Bureau, the city has a total area of 3.20 square miles (8.29 km^{2}), of which 3.03 square miles (7.85 km^{2}) is land and 0.17 square miles (0.44 km^{2}) is water.

=== Climate ===
Eagle River has a cool humid continental climate (Köppen Dfb), with long, very cold winters and short, warm summers. Annually the temperature drops below 32 °F (0 °C) on 190 days, and below 0 °F (-17.8 °C) on 39 days. The comfortable summers result in only one day per year on average with temperatures exceeding 90 °F (32.2 °C).

Climate data for Eagle River, Wisconsin (1991–2020 normals, extremes 1939–present)
Month	Jan	Feb	Mar	Apr	May	Jun	Jul	Aug	Sep	Oct	Nov	Dec	Year
Record high °F (°C)	48 (9)	56 (13)	79 (26)	82 (28)	93 (34)	94 (34)	99 (37)	96 (36)	90 (32)	83 (28)	73 (23)	57 (14)	99 (37)
Mean maximum °F (°C)	38.3 (3.5)	44.3 (6.8)	57.6 (14.2)	72.9 (22.7)	82.6 (28.1)	87.8 (31.0)	89.0 (31.7)	86.7 (30.4)	83.2 (28.4)	73.2 (22.9)	55.7 (13.2)	43.1 (6.2)	90.6 (32.6)
Mean daily maximum °F (°C)	21.2 (−6.0)	25.8 (−3.4)	37.1 (2.8)	50.2 (10.1)	65.1 (18.4)	74.7 (23.7)	78.1 (25.6)	75.3 (24.1)	67.4 (19.7)	52.9 (11.6)	38.0 (3.3)	26.3 (−3.2)	51.0 (10.6)
Daily mean °F (°C)	11.7 (−11.3)	14.5 (−9.7)	25.2 (−3.8)	38.2 (3.4)	52.3 (11.3)	62.4 (16.9)	66.0 (18.9)	63.7 (17.6)	55.9 (13.3)	42.8 (6.0)	29.6 (−1.3)	18.0 (−7.8)	40.0 (4.4)
Mean daily minimum °F (°C)	2.2 (−16.6)	3.2 (−16.0)	13.3 (−10.4)	26.3 (−3.2)	39.4 (4.1)	50.1 (10.1)	53.9 (12.2)	52.1 (11.2)	44.3 (6.8)	32.7 (0.4)	21.3 (−5.9)	9.8 (−12.3)	29.1 (−1.6)
Mean minimum °F (°C)	−19.9 (−28.8)	−18.4 (−28.0)	−11.2 (−24.0)	10.2 (−12.1)	25.3 (−3.7)	35.6 (2.0)	43.2 (6.2)	40.2 (4.6)	30.1 (−1.1)	20.9 (−6.2)	4.0 (−15.6)	−12.0 (−24.4)	−23.2 (−30.7)
Record low °F (°C)	−34 (−37)	−36 (−38)	−28 (−33)	−6 (−21)	13 (−11)	26 (−3)	36 (2)	32 (0)	20 (−7)	10 (−12)	−11 (−24)	−24 (−31)	−36 (−38)
Average precipitation inches (mm)	1.26 (32)	1.06 (27)	1.61 (41)	2.78 (71)	3.51 (89)	4.06 (103)	4.01 (102)	3.20 (81)	3.61 (92)	3.55 (90)	1.92 (49)	1.56 (40)	32.13 (816)
Average snowfall inches (cm)	15.2 (39)	14.1 (36)	10.0 (25)	7.7 (20)	0.3 (0.76)	0.0 (0.0)	0.0 (0.0)	0.0 (0.0)	0.0 (0.0)	2.1 (5.3)	9.5 (24)	17.6 (45)	76.5 (194)
Average precipitation days (≥ 0.01 in)	10.7	7.7	8.5	10.8	11.9	11.7	11.9	10.2	11.8	13.3	11.0	10.1	129.6
Average snowy days (≥ 0.1 in)	10.8	7.4	5.6	2.7	0.1	0.0	0.0	0.0	0.0	1.1	5.8	9.0	42.5
Source: NOAA

== Demographics ==
Historical population
Census	Pop.	Note	%±
1890	1,150		—
1910	1,141		—
1920	672		−41.1%
1930	1,386		106.3%
1940	1,491		7.6%
1950	1,469		−1.5%
1960	1,367		−6.9%
1970	1,326		−3.0%
1980	1,326		0.0%
1990	1,374		3.6%
2000	1,443		5.0%
2010	1,398		−3.1%
2020	1,628		16.5%
U.S. Decennial Census

=== 2010 census ===
As of the census of 2010, there were 1,398 people, 684 households, and 308 families residing in the city. The population density was 461.4 inhabitants per square mile (178.1/km^{2}). There were 876 housing units at an average density of 289.1 per square mile (111.6/km^{2}). The racial makeup of the city was 93.0% White, 0.8% African American, 3.5% Native American, 0.1% Asian, 1.1% from other races, and 1.6% from two or more races. Hispanic or Latino of any race were 1.9% of the population.

There were 684 households, of which 21.8% had children under the age of 18 living with them, 28.7% were married couples living together, 12.1% had a female householder with no husband present, 4.2% had a male householder with no wife present, and 55.0% were non-families. 46.5% of all households were made up of individuals, and 22.5% had someone living alone who was 65 years of age or older. The average household size was 1.89 and the average family size was 2.68.

The median age in the city was 43.2 years. 18% of residents were under the age of 18; 9.4% were between the ages of 18 and 24; 25.2% were from 25 to 44; 24.5% were from 45 to 64; and 23% were 65 years of age or older. The gender makeup of the city was 49.1% male and 50.9% female.

=== 2000 census ===
As of the census of 2000, there were 1,443 people, 626 households, and 321 families residing in the city. The population density was 566.3 people per square mile (218.5/km^{2}). There were 726 housing units at an average density of 284.9 per square mile (109.9/km^{2}). The racial makeup of the city was 95.98% White, 1.39% African American, 1.94% Native American, 0.07% Pacific Islander, 0.35% from other races, and 0.28% from two or more races. Hispanic or Latino of any race were 0.83% of the population.

There were 626 households, out of which 23.0% had children under the age of 18 living with them, 35.8% were married couples living together, 11.2% had a female householder with no husband present, and 48.7% were non-families. 43.6% of all households were made up of individuals, and 24.6% had someone living alone who was 65 years of age or older. The average household size was 2.01 and the average family size was 2.80.

In the city, the population was spread out, with 19.4% under the age of 18, 8.2% from 18 to 24, 25.4% from 25 to 44, 20.6% from 45 to 64, and 26.5% who were 65 years of age or older. The median age was 42 years. For every 100 females, there were 82.4 males. For every 100 females age 18 and over, there were 76.7 males.

The median income for a household in the city was $23,611, and the median income for a family was $36,339. Males had a median income of $29,375 versus $21,477 for females. The per capita income for the city was $15,876. About 8.6% of families and 11.8% of the population were below the poverty line, including 15.9% of those under age 18 and 11.7% of those age 65 or over.

== Government ==
City of Eagle River vote by party in presidential elections
Year	Democratic	Republican	Third parties
2024	39.6% 367	59.0% 547	1.4% 13
2020	41.7% 387	56.4% 523	1.9% 18

== Sports and recreation ==
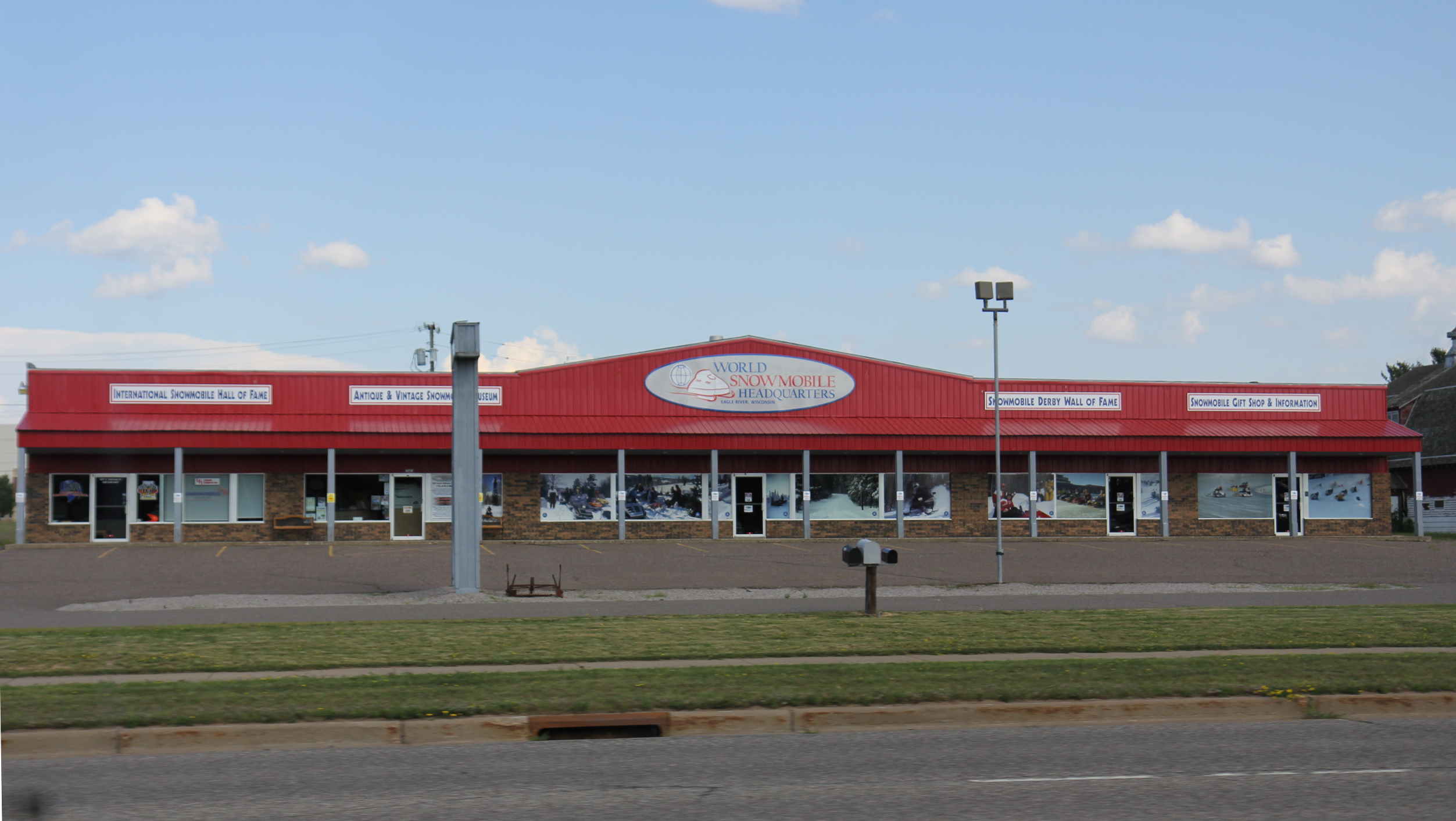
World Snowmobile Headquarters

Common recreational activities include boating, camping, fishing, swimming, hunting, golfing, ice fishing, and snowmobiling. Bald eagles can be viewed here, the source of the name "Eagle" River.

Eagle River is known as the "Snowmobile Capital of the World" because of the World Championship Snowmobile Derby held for over 50 years at an ice oval on the north side of the city. There are over 500 miles of groomed snowmobile trails in the county. The World Snowmobile Headquarters and International Snowmobile Hall of Fame are located in Eagle River.

The Wisconsin Hockey Hall of Fame is in Eagle River Stadium in Eagle River. The stadium is home to the Eagle River Falcons in the GLHL. Eagle River has been the host of the Labatt Blue USA hockey pond hockey championship games. Both of these have earned Eagle River the nickname "The Hockey Capital of Wisconsin."

Eagle River has a public golf course, ERGC, located at 457 East McKinley Street just east of the airport. The Par 72 course has a total length of 6,239 yards from the blue tee markers.

Although Eagle River, WI is known for its sports and recreation, there wasn't always a dedicated space for students and community members. During the New Deal Era, many men were unemployed and the need for a job was at an all-time high. With a population of 1,386, this W.P.A New Deal project employed 25 men who contributed to 9,940 hours of work in 4 months in 1937. Efforts made by the W.P.A provided much-needed space for local students also helped keep the town's sports culture, which continues to thrive today. This project impacted those 25 unemployed men involved, offering them a job and a sense of pride and purpose during a difficult time in history, while benefiting both students and the community.

== Media ==
- WERL (AM) 950, Freedom Talk
- WRJO FM 94.5, Oldies

== Transportation ==
=== Major highways ===
U.S. 45 travels northbound to Land o' Lakes. Southbound, US 45 routes to Three Lakes and Antigo.
WIS 17 travels north concurrently with US 45 and WIS 32 approximately 4 miles (6.4 km) before splitting off northeasterly towards Phelps and west concurrently with WIS 70 before turning south towards Rhinelander, Wisconsin.
WIS 32 runs concurrently with US 45 through Eagle River.
WIS 70 travels east on a winding course through the Chequamegon-Nicolet National Forest to Florence and west via St. Germain to Woodruff and Minocqua.

=== Airport ===
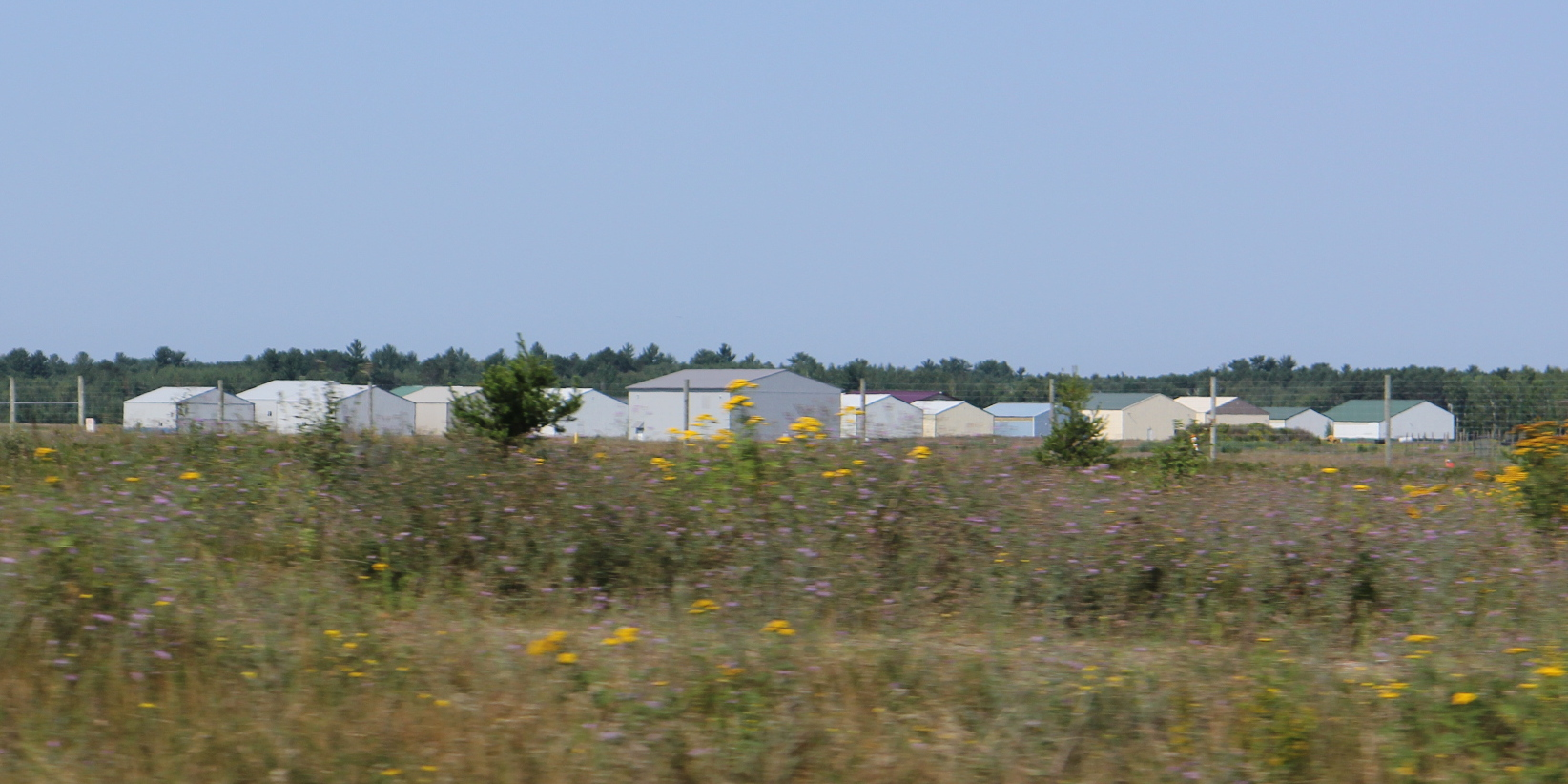
Eagle River Union Airport

Eagle River is served by the Eagle River Union Airport (KEGV), which serves as a landing spot for seasonal home owners. Located just northwest of the city, the airport handles approximately 12,000 operations per year, with roughly 87% general aviation and 13% air taxi. The airport has a 5,000-ft asphalt primary runway with approved GPS and LOC/DME approaches (Runway 4-22), a 3,400-ft asphalt crosswind runway (Runway 13-31) and a helipad. The nearest commercial airport is located 30 miles southwest in Rhinelander, Wisconsin.

== Healthcare ==
Aspirus Eagle River Hospital is a 14-bed critical access hospital in Eagle River. There are 3 primary care physicians per 100,000 population in Eagle River compared to the statewide average of 75.6. The area is located in both a mental health and primary care Health Professional Shortage Area (HPSA) qualifying Eagle River as a medical desert. By 2035, Eagle River is expected to have a 92% deficit in physicians, the second largest projected deficit in Wisconsin. There are no behavioral health physicians in Eagle River.

== Notable people ==
- Jim Abrahams, director and screenwriter
- Charles Comiskey, former owner of the Chicago White Sox, member of the National Baseball Hall of Fame
- John A. Conant, lawyer and Wisconsin state legislator
- Claire Decker, racing car driver
- Natalie Decker, NASCAR driver
- Paige Decker, racing car driver
- Edward A. Everett, proprietor and Wisconsin state legislator
- Herman Finger, entrepreneurial lumberman
- Emil Gross, MLB player
- Craig Ludwig, NHL player and assistant coach
- Sean McKeever, comic book writer
- Arthur William McLeod, lawyer and Wisconsin state legislator
- Robert Peters, poet
- Daniel E. Riordan, teacher, lawyer and Wisconsin state legislator
- Joe Simonton, reporter of UFO encounter
- Margaret P. Varda, lawyer and Wisconsin state legislator
- Cy Williams, MLB player
- Jinelle Zaugg-Siergiej, Olympic athlete
- Jim Rome, Hall of Fame Sports Broadcaster

== Images ==
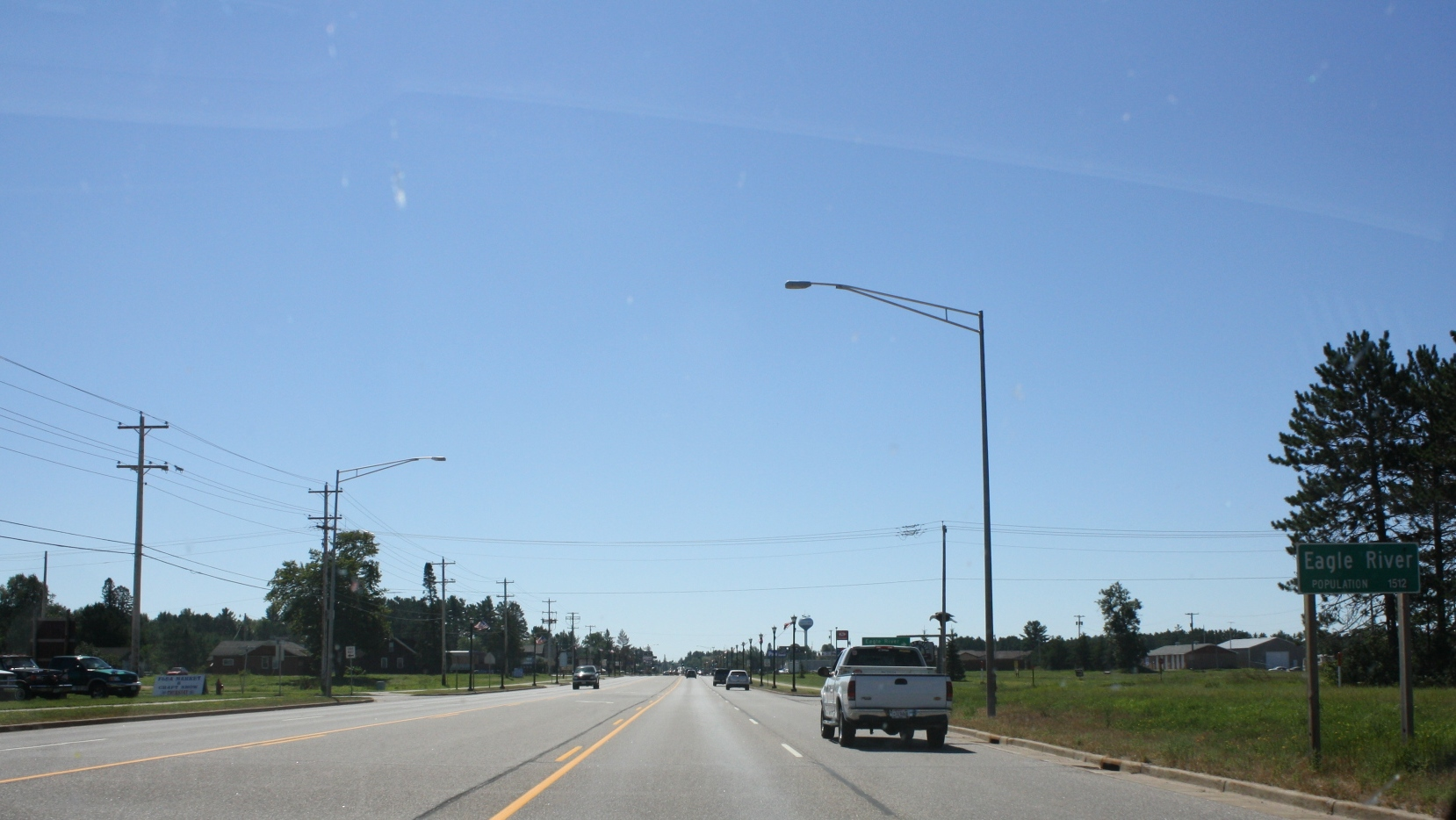
Sign on U.S. Route 45

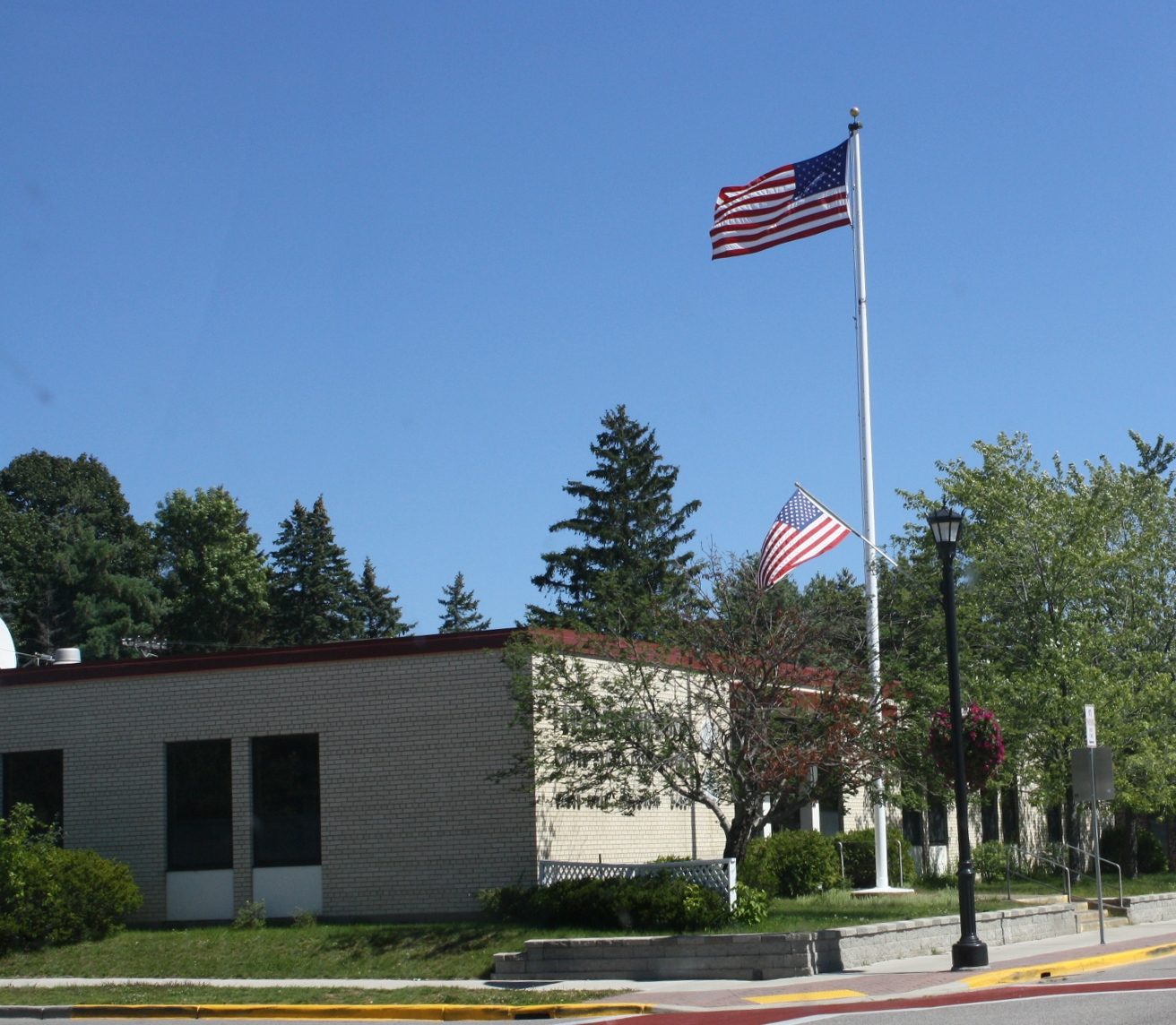
Post office

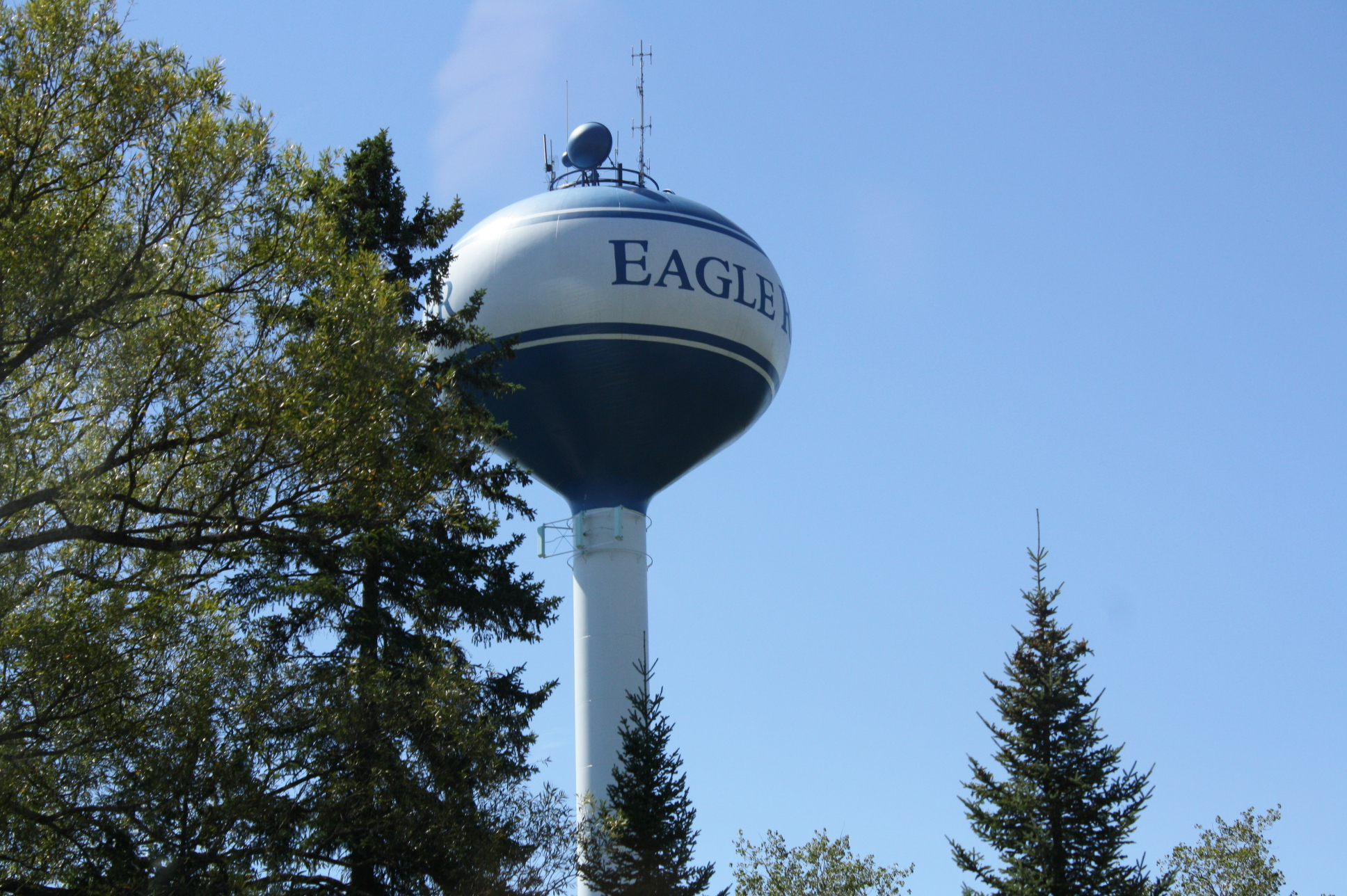
Water tower

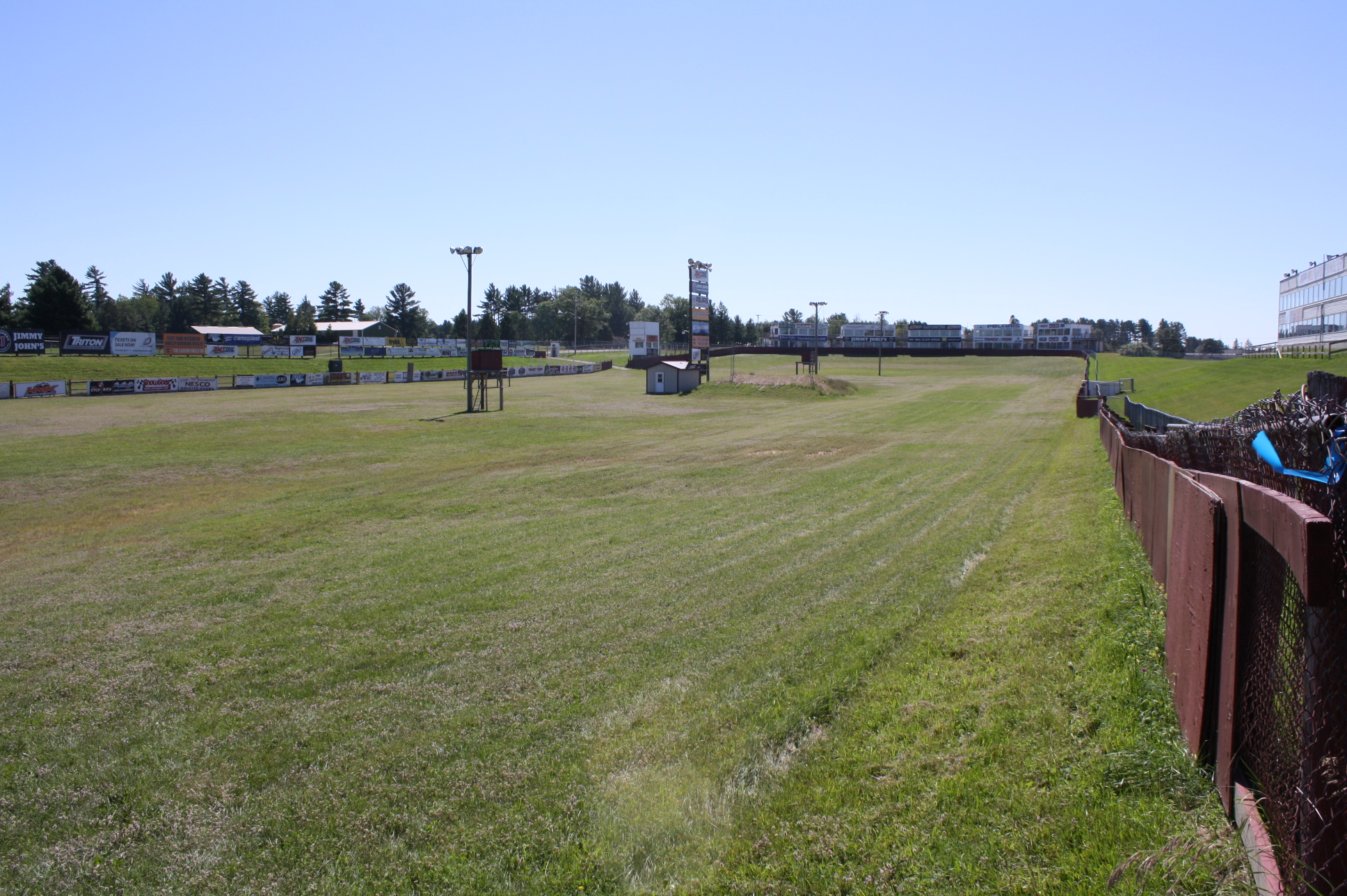
Eagle River Derby Track in summer

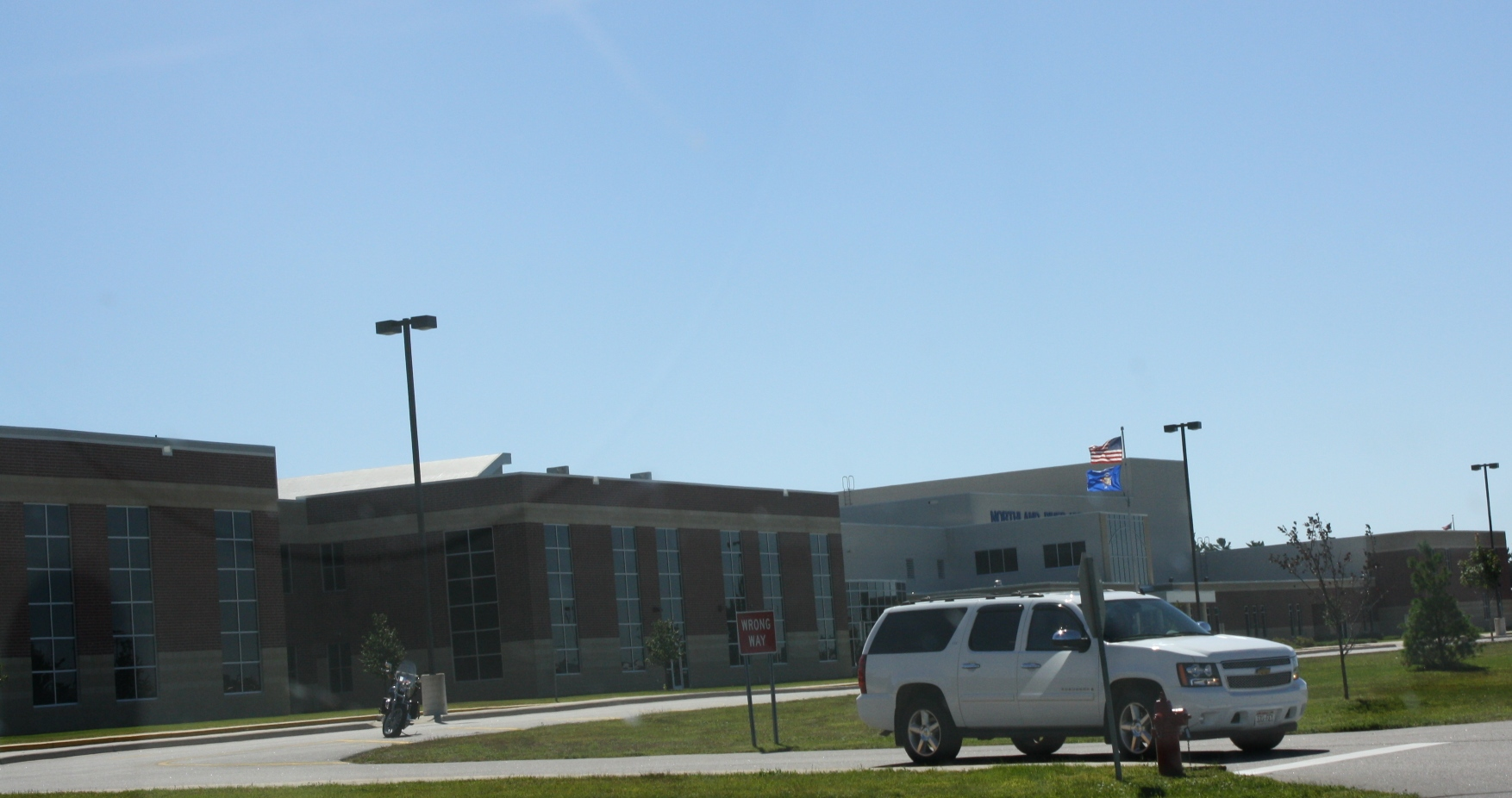
Northland Pines High School

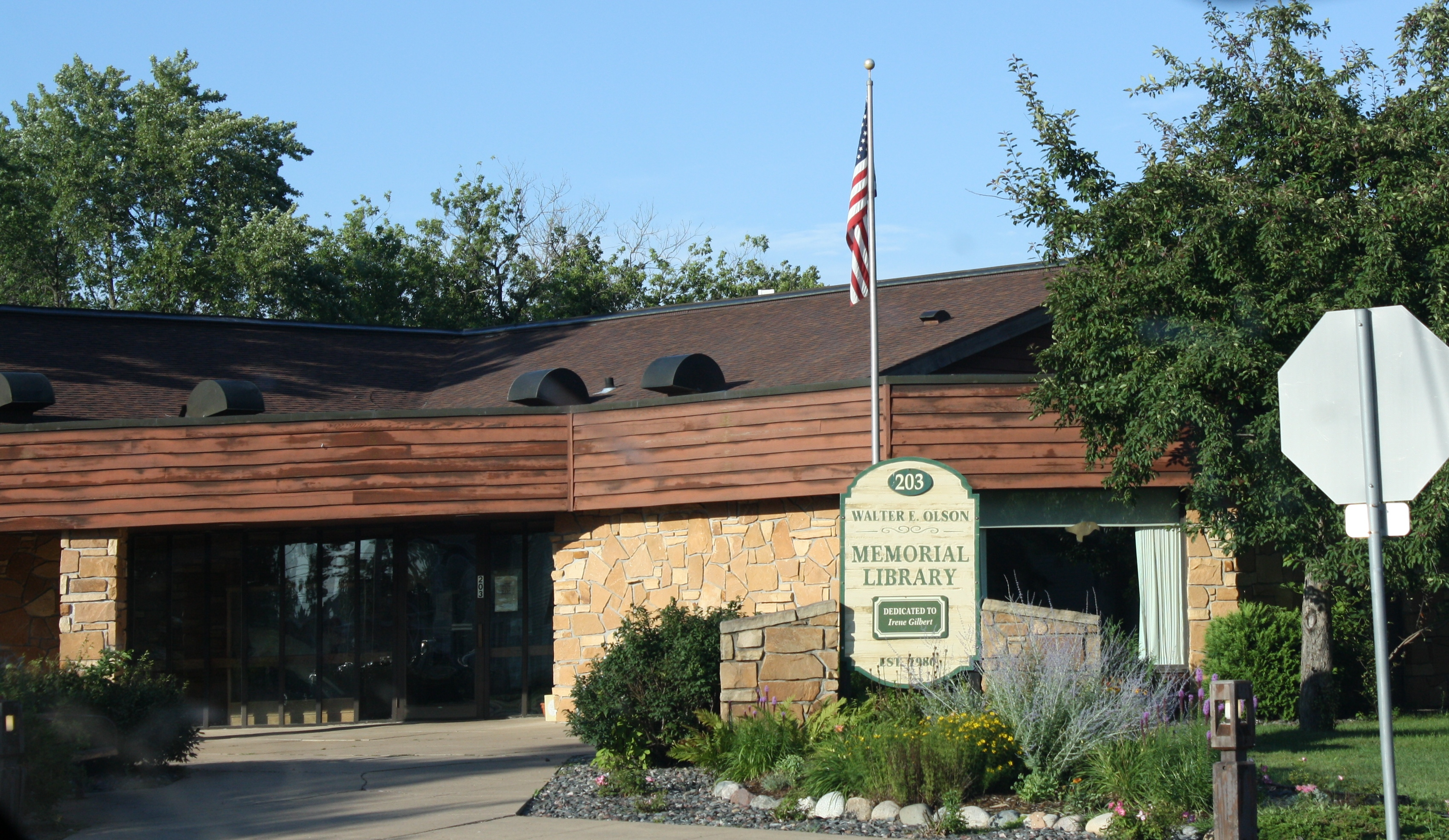
Walter Olson Memorial Library
