= List of lakes of Vilas County, Wisconsin =

Vilas County has more lakes than any other county in Wisconsin, with 563 named and 755 unnamed lakes covering 93,889 acres. Lac Vieux Desert near Phelps, at 4017 acres, is the largest.

Named lakes are listed below. Alternate names are indicated in parentheses.

- Adams Lake
- Adelade Lake
- Afterglow Lake (Little Bass)
- Aimer Lake, Lower
- Aimer Lake, Upper
- Alder Lake
- Aldridge Lake (Range Line)
- Allequash Lake
- Allequash Springs
- Alma Lake
- Alva Lake
- Ambleside Lake (Perch)
- Amik Lake (Rice, Pike)
- Anderson Lake
- Annabelle Lake (Anna)
- Anne Lake
- Anne Lake
- Anvil Lake
- Apeekwa Lake (Little Pine)
- Armour Lake
- Arrowhead Lake (Little Star)
- Aspen Lake (Bass)
- Aurora Lake (Rice)
- Averill Lake (Mud)
- Baker Lake
- Baker Lake
- Ballard Lake
- Balsam Lake
- Bambi Lake
- Basin Lake
- Bass Lake
- Battine Lake
- Bear Lake
- Bear Springs
- Beatrice Lake
- Beatrice Lake
- Beaver Lake
- Beaver Lake
- Belle Lake
- Bena Lake (Ben)
- Benedict Lake
- Bennett Lake
- Benny Lake (Ben)
- Benson Lake
- Big Arbor Vitae Lake
- Big Bateau Lake
- Big Crooked Lake
- Big Crooked Lake
- Big Donahue Lake
- Big Gibson Lake
- Big Hurst Lake
- Big Kitten Lake
- Big Lake
- Big Lake
- Big Muskellunge Lake
- Big Portage Lake
- Big Sand Lake
- Big Saint Germain Lake
- Bills Lake
- Birch Lake
- Bittersweet Lake (Crooked)
- Black Oak Lake
- Blue Gill Lake
- Blueberry Lake
- Blueberry Lake
- Bobidosh Lake
- Bobs Lake
- Bolin Lake (Bog, Oswego)
- Bolton Lake
- Boot Lake
- Boot Lake
- Borden Lake
- Boulder Lake
- Boygan Lake
- Bragonier Lake
- Brandy Lake (Cecilia)
- Brazell Lake
- Broken Bow Lake
- Brown Beaver Lake
- Buck Lake
- Buckatabon Lake, Lower
- Buckatabon Lake, Upper
- Buckskin Lake
- Bug Lake
- Bug Lake
- Bullfrog Lake
- Butterfly Lake
- Camp Five Lake
- Camp Lake
- Camp One Lake
- Camp Ten Lake (Sand)
- Camp Twelve Lake, East
- Camp Twelve Lake, West
- Camp Two Lake
- Canteen Lake
- Carlin Lake
- Carpenter Lake
- Carrol Lake
- Caspian Lake
- Catfish Lake
- Cathaline Lake
- Catherine Lake
- Cedar Lake
- Cedar Lake
- Chamberlain Lake
- Chewelah Lake (Spruce)
- Chickaree Lake (Deer)
- Chub Lake (Little Chub)
- Circle Lily Lake
- Clair Lake
- Clear Lake
- Clear Lake (Near)
- Clearwater Lake
- Cleveland Lake
- Cochran Lake
- Coffee Lake
- Constance Lake
- Content Lake
- Cooks Lake
- Corrine Lake
- Crab Lake
- Crab Lake, North
- Crampton Lake
- Cranberry Lake
- Crawford Lake
- Crawling Stone Lake
- Croker Lake (Bass)
- Crystal Lake
- Crystal Lake
- Curve Lake
- Dad Lake (Lillian)
- Dalzell Lake (Dezel)
- David Lake
- Day Lake
- Dead Pike Lake
- Deadman Lake
- Deadwood Lake
- Decker Lake (Shanty)
- Deep Lake
- Deer Lake
- Deer Lake
- Deer Lake
- Deerfoot Lake (Bass)
- Deerpath Lake
- Deerskin Lake
- Denton Lake
- Devils Lake
- Devine Lake (Dollar)
- Dewey Lake
- Diamond Lake
- Doe Lake
- Dog Lake
- Dollar Lake
- Dollar Lake
- Donahue Lake
- Dorothy Dunn Lake
- Dorothy Lake
- Drott Lake
- Dry Lake
- Duck Lake
- Dunn Lake
- Eagle Lake
- Eagle Lake
- Edith Lake
- Edith Lake
- Eleanore Lake
- Elizabeth Lake
- Ellen Lake
- Ellerson Lake, East
- Ellerson Lake, Middle
- Ellerson Lake, West
- Eloise Lake
- Elsie Lake
- Emerald Lake (Ruth, Long)
- Emil Lake
- Emily Lake
- Erickson Lake
- Erwin Lake (Battle)
- Escanaba Lake (Rock)
- Ethel Lake
- Etna Lake
- Ewald Lake
- Fallison Lake (Long)
- Faulkner Lake
- Favil Lake (Favill)
- Fawn Lake
- Fawn Lake
- Fence Lake
- Findler Lake
- Finger Lake
- Finley Lake
- Firefly Lake (Weber)
- Fishtrap Lake
- Flambeau Lake (Lac Du Flambeau)
- Flora Lake
- Forest Lake (Goose)
- Found Lake
- Fox Lake
- Franchian Lake (Gretchen)
- Frank Lake (Bear)
- Frost Lake (Mud)
- Gail Lake
- Gateway Lake
- Gem Lake (McGuire)
- Gene Lake
- Genevieve Lake
- George Lake
- George Lake
- Gilbert Lake
- Goodall Lake
- Goodyear Springs
- Gordon Lake
- Grant Lake
- Grassy Lake
- Great Corn Lake (Twin, Bass)
- Gresham Lake, Lower
- Gresham Lake, Middle
- Gresham Lake, Upper
- Gretchen Lake (Charles)
- Grey Lake (Gray)
- Gross Lake
- Gunlock Lake
- Halls Lake
- Hardin Lake
- Harmony Lake
- Harriet Lake
- Harris Lake
- Harvey Lake
- Haskell Lake
- Headflyer Lake
- Heart Lake
- Heart Lake
- Helen Lake
- Helen Lake
- Hells Kitchen Lake
- Helmet Lake
- Hennig Lake
- Hiawatha Lake
- Hiawatha Lake (Long)
- High Lake
- Hillis Lake
- Hobo Lake
- Homestead Lake
- Honeysuckle Lake (Mud Minnow)
- Horsehead Lake
- Horseshoe Lake
- Hungry Lake
- Hunter Lake
- Hurrah Lake
- Ike Walton Lake
- Ila Lake
- Imogene Lake
- Indian Lake
- Inkpot Lake
- Irving Lake
- Island Lake
- Jag Lake
- Jean Lake
- Jenny Lake
- Jerms Lake
- Jewel Lake
- John Lake
- Johnson Lake
- Johnson Lake
- Jones Lake
- Joyce Lake
- Jute Lake
- Kasomo Lake
- Katinka Lake
- Keego Lake
- Kentuck Lake
- Kenu Lake (Alice)
- Kildare Lake (Pine)
- Kitten Lake (Mud, Rahr)
- Klondike Lake
- Knife Lake
- Korth Lake
- Kuehn Lake
- Lac des Fleurs (Razorback)
- Lac du Lune (Island)
- Lac Vieux Desert
- Lake o Pines
- Lake of the Hills (Sucker)
- Lake of the Woods
- Landing Lake (Charlotte)
- Langley Lake
- Laura Lake
- Lawler Lake (Bass)
- Lewis Lake
- Little Arbor Vitae Lake
- Little Bass Lake
- Little Bass Lake
- Little Bateau Lake
- Little Cloud Lake (Johnson)
- Little Corn Lake (Twin, Bass)
- Little Crab Lake
- Little Crawling Stone Lake
- Little Crooked Lake
- Little Donahue Lake
- Little Gibson Lake
- Little Horsehead Lake
- Little Hurst Lake
- Little John Jr. Lake
- Little John Lake
- Little Jute Lake
- Little Mamie Lake
- Little Muskie Lake
- Little Papoose Lake
- Little Pine Lake
- Little Portage Lake
- Little Presque Isle Lake
- Little Rice Lake
- Little Rock Lake
- Little Sand Lake
- Little Spider Lake (Gaffrey)
- Little St Germain Lake
- Little Star Lake
- Little Star Lake
- Little Sugarbush Lake (Deer)
- Little Tamarack Lake
- Little Ten Lake
- Little Trout Lake
- Lone Pine Lake
- Lone Tree Lake
- Lonewood Lake
- Long Interlaken Lake (Long)
- Long Lake
- Loon Lake
- Lost Canoe Lake
- Lost Lake
- Lotus Lake (Little Bass)
- Lucy Lake
- Lynx Lake
- Lynx Lake
- Mabel Lake
- Madeline Lake (Mud)
- Mamie Lake
- Manitowish Lake
- Mann Lake
- Manuel Lake
- Maple Lake (Long)
- Marion Lake
- Marlands Lake
- Marsh Lake
- Marshall Lake
- Mary Lake
- Mary Lake
- McCabe Lake (Lenore)
- McCullough Lake
- McDonald Lake
- McKinney Lake (Big Chub)
- McLeod Lake
- Mermaid Lake
- Merrill Lake
- Meta Lake
- Midge Lake
- Mielke Lake (Number
- Mill Lake (Charlotte)
- Minette Lake (L Bass, Spruce)
- Minonk Lake (Deer)
- Mirror Lake (George)
- Mitten Lake
- Moccasin Lake
- Monahan Lake
- Moon Lake
- Moraine Lake
- Morton Lake
- Moss Lake (Little Mud)
- Moving Cloud Lake
- Mud Lake
- Mud Lake
- Mud Lake
- Mud Minnow Lake (Minnow)
- Murphy Lake
- Muskeg Lake
- Muskellunge Lake
- Muskesin Lake (Big Bass)
- Myrtle Lake
- Mystery Lake
- Nebish Lake
- Nell Lake
- Nellie Lake
- Nelson Lake
- Nelson Lake
- Nichols Lake
- Ninemile Lake, Lower
- Ninemile Lake, Upper
- Nineweb Lake (Hilda)
- Nixon Lake
- No Mans Lake
- Norwood Lake (Boot)
- Noseeum Lake
- Noseeum Lake
- Nudist Lake (Crystal)
- Oberlin Lake (Long)
- Oriole Lake
- Osceola Lake (Little Pickerel)
- Oswego Lake
- Otter Lake
- Oxbow Lake
- Pallette Lake (Clear)
- Palmer Lake
- Papoose Lake
- Pardee Lake
- Partridge Lake
- Patterson Lake
- Pauto Lake (Plato)
- Pearl Lake
- Perch Lake
- Perch Lake
- Perry Lake
- Pickel Lake
- Pickerel Lake
- Pickerel Lake
- Pier Lake (Cranberry)
- Pincherry Lake (Anderson)
- Pine Island Lake (Bass)
- Pine Lake (Mud)
- Pinkeye Lake
- Pioneer Lake
- Placid Twin Lake, North
- Placid Twin Lake, South
- Pleasant Lake (Bluegill)
- Plum Lake
- Plummer Lake
- Plymouth Lake
- Pokegama Lake
- Pollack Lake
- Potfish Lake
- Poupart Lake
- Presque Isle Lake
- Presque Springs
- Prong Lake
- Punch Lake
- Rade Lake
- Rainbow Lake
- Rainbow Spring
- Range Line Lake
- Raven Lake (Dead)
- Razorback Lake
- Red Bass Lake
- Red Lake
- Reiter Lake
- Reservoir Lake
- Rest Lake
- Rice Lake
- Rice Lake
- Roach Lake
- Roach Lake
- Robinson Lake
- Rock Lake
- Rosalind Lake (Mary, Bass)
- Rose Lake
- Ross Allen Lake
- Ross Lake
- Round Lake
- Rudolph Lake
- Rudolph Lake
- Rush Lake (Clear, Bass)
- Russet Lake (No Mans)
- Safford Lake
- Salsich Lake (Bass)
- Sanborn Lake
- Sanford Lake
- Scaffold Lake
- Scat Lake
- Scattering Rice Lake
- Secret Lake
- Seneca Lake (Little Turtle)
- Seventeen Lake
- Shannon Lake (Anderson)
- Sherman Lake (Lost)
- Shishebogama Lake
- Signal Lake (Star)
- Silver Lake
- Sime Lake
- Smith Lake
- Smoky Lake
- Snake Lake
- Snipe Lake
- Snort Lake
- Snyder Lake
- Soleit Lake
- Sparkling Lake (Silver)
- Spectacle Lake
- Spider Lake
- Spirit Lake
- Spread Lake
- Spring Lake
- Spring Lake
- Spruce Lake
- Squash Lake
- Squaw Lake
- Squirrel Lake
- Star Lake
- Starrett Lake
- Statehouse Lake (Tower)
- Stateline Lake
- Statenaker Lake
- Stearns Lake
- Stella Lake
- Stepping Stone Lake No. 1
- Stepping Stone Lake No. 2
- SteppingS tone Lake No. 3
- Stewart Lake
- Stone Lake
- Stormy Lake
- Street Lake
- StubWalsh Lake
- Sturgeon Lake
- Sugar Maple Lake (Big Bass)
- Sugarbush Lake, Lower
- Sugarbush Lake, Middle
- Sugarbush Lake, Upper
- Sumach Lake (Long)
- Sunfish Lake
- Sunset Lake (Round)
- Tamarack Lake
- Tambling Lake
- Tank Lake
- Taylor Lake (Stevens)
- Tellefson Lake
- Tenderfoot Lake
- Tepee Lake (Bass)
- Tinsel Lake (Little Bass)
- Tippecanoe Lake (Island)
- Torch Lake (Home)
- Toulish Lake (Statenaker)
- Towanda Lake (Bass)
- Tower Lake
- Toy Lake (Rat)
- Trilby Lake
- Trostel Lake
- Trout Bog Lake
- Trout Lake
- Turner Lake
- Turtle Lake, North
- Turtle Lake, South
- Twin Island Lake
- Twin Lake, North
- Twin Lake, South
- Van Vliet Lake
- Vance Lake (Dam, Dan)
- Vandercook Lake (Crane)
- Verna Lake
- Vista Lake
- Voyageur Lake (Smile-A-While)
- Wabasso Lake (Clear, Bass)
- Wakefield Lake
- Warrior Lake (Bass, Grassy)
- Warvet Lake (Big, Pickerel)
- Watersmeet Lake
- Weber Lake
- West Bay Lake
- Wharton Lake
- Whispering Lake
- White Birch Lake
- White Sand Lake
- White Sand Lake
- White Spruce Lake (Kinder)
- White Squaw Lake
- Whitefish Lake
- Whitney Lake (Harrington)
- Wild Rice Lake (Half Way)
- Wildcat Lake
- Wildwood Lake (Geneva)
- Williams Lake
- Wilson Lake (Deer)
- Winifred Lake
- Wishow Lake
- Witches Lake, East
- Witches Lake, West
- Wolf Lake
- Wolf Lake
- Wood Lake
- Wool Lake
- Wyandock Lake
- Yellow Birch Lake
- Yolanda Lake
- Zee Lake

== See also ==
- List of lakes in Wisconsin
