= List of lakes of Marinette County, Wisconsin =

There are 242 named lakes in Marinette County, Wisconsin, along with 200 with no names. Together they make up 13,735 acres of surface area. Noquebay Lake, at 2,409 acres, is the largest.

Named lakes are listed below. Alternate names are indicated in parentheses.

- Angle Lake
- Annabelle Lake
- Babson Pond
- Back Lake
- Back Lake
- Bagley Flowage
- Bahlert Lake (Rainbow)
- Balsam Lake
- Barlow Lake
- Barnes Lake
- Barr Lake
- Bass Lake
- Bass Lake
- Bear Lake
- Beecher Lake
- Belgian Lake
- Benson Lake
- Berry Lake
- Big Newton Lake
- Big Quinnesec Falls Flowage
- Birch Lake
- Borth Lake
- Bottle Lake
- Boundary Lake (Bass)
- Brandywine Lake
- Brock Pond
- Brooks Lake
- Bullhead Lake
- Butterfly Lake
- Caldron Falls Reservoir
- Camp B Lake
- Camp Lake
- Campbell Lake
- Campbell Lake
- Cedar Lake
- Chalk Hill Flowage
- Chapman Lake
- Christian Lake
- Chrizel Lake
- Clarey Lake
- Clark Lake (Mud)
- Cole Lake
- Coleman Lake
- Cotas Lake
- Crandall Lake
- Crane Lake
- Crooked Lake
- D’Amour Lake (Mud)
- Deer Lake
- Devils Lake
- Disney Lake
- Dolan Lake
- Downing Lake
- Duck Lake
- Dvorak Lake
- Eagle Lake
- Echo Lake
- Elbow Lake
- Elm Flats Lake
- Engleman Lake
- Fence Lake
- Finnegan Lake
- Frieda Lake
- Fryingpan Lake
- Giese Lake (Mud)
- Gilas Lake
- Glen Lake
- Golden Lake
- Goodman Mill Pond
- Grand Rapids Flowage
- Grandfather Lake
- Grass Lake
- Grass Lake
- Harper Lake
- Harvey Lake
- Harwell Lake
- Hazel Lake
- Headquarters Lake
- Heart Lake
- Heisel Lake
- Helen Lake
- Heubler Lake
- High Falls Reservoir
- Hilbert Lake (Orwig)
- Hobachee Lake
- Homestead Lake
- Horsehead Lake
- Horseshoe Lake
- House Lake
- Huber Lake (Deer)
- Island Lake
- Island Lake
- John Lake
- Johnson and Beach Lake
- Johnson Falls Flowage
- Jones Lake
- Joy Lake
- Julia Lake
- June Lake
- Kahles Pond
- Kellinbach Lake
- Kidd Lake
- Kimlark Lake
- King Lake
- Kirby Lake
- Kiss Lake
- Kiss Lake
- La Fave Lake (La Faye)
- Left Foot Lake
- Lehman Lake (Dolan)
- Lillie Lake
- Lily Lake
- Lily Lake
- Lindquist Lake
- Little Island Lake
- Little McCall Lake
- Little Nelligan Lake
- Little Newton Lake
- Little Perch Lake
- Little Poche de Noche
- Little Quinnesec Falls Flowage
- Little Spring Lake
- Little Wolf Lake
- Long Lake
- Long Lake
- Lost Lake
- Lost Lake
- Lost Lake
- Luedevitz Lake (Luedvitz)
- Lundgren Lake
- Marl Lake
- Marsh Lake
- Mary Lake
- Mathis Lake
- Mattrich Lake
- McAllister Pond
- McCall Lake (Big Aldrich)
- McCaslin Lake
- McDonald Lake
- Medbrook Lake
- Merriman Lake
- Minnie Lake
- Mirror Lake
- Mirror Lake
- Miscauno Pond
- Monson Lake
- Montana Lake
- Moon Lake
- Moose Lake
- Morgan Lake
- Mountain Lake
- Mud Lake
- Mud Lake
- Mud Lake
- Mud Lake
- Mud Lake
- Mullaney Lake
- Murbou Lake
- Murphy Lake
- Nadjak Lake
- Nelligan Lake
- Newbar Lake
- Noquebay Lake (Noque)
- North Pond
- Old Veteran Lake
- Oneonta Lake (Hilbert, North)
- Otter Lake
- Papoose Lake
- Perch Lake
- Perch Lake
- Perch Lake
- Peshtigo Flowage
- Petryk Lake
- Phillips Lake
- Phillips Lake
- Pickerel Pond, East
- Pickerel Pond, West
- Pine Lake
- Poche de Noche
- Porcupine Lake
- Pothole Lake
- Railroad Pond
- Rainbow Lake
- Rector Lake
- Redman Lake
- Retcof Lake
- Rock Lake
- Rollins Lake
- Rollins Lake
- Rooney Lake
- Roosevelt Lake
- Rosey Lake
- Round Lake
- Round Lake
- Rush Lake
- Sackerson Lake
- Sand Lake
- Sandstone Flowage
- Scott Flowage, Lower
- Scott Flowage, Upper
- Second Lake
- Shannon Lake
- Silver Lake
- Simpson Lake
- Sixteen Lake
- Smith Lake
- Spencer Lake
- Spies Lake
- Spring Lake
- Springer Lake
- Spruce Lake
- Spur Lake
- Squaw Lake
- Star Lake
- Stephenson Lake
- Stovelin Lake
- Sturgeon Falls Flowage
- Taylor Lake (Phillips)
- The Spring
- Thoeming Lake
- Thunder Lake
- Timms Lake
- Town Corner Lake
- Trout Haven Pond
- Trout Lake
- Trout Lake
- Trout Lake
- Twin Bessies Lakes (Fawn)
- Twin Lake
- Twin Lake, West and East
- Upper Lake
- Vic Lake
- Wausaukee Lake
- White Rapids Flowage
- Wiggins Lake
- Williams Lake
- Woempner Lake
- Wolf Lake
- Wolf Lake
- Wolf Lake
- Wonder Lake
- Woods Lake
- Woods Lake
- Yankee Lake
- Young Lake

== See also ==
- List of lakes in Wisconsin
