= Lac du Flambeau, Wisconsin (disambiguation) =

Lac du Flambeau may refer to any of the following places in the U.S. state of Wisconsin:

- Lac du Flambeau (town), Wisconsin, a town
- Lac du Flambeau (CDP), Wisconsin, a census-designated place
- Lac du Flambeau Band of Lake Superior Chippewa, a Native American reservation
