= Fence Lake (Wisconsin) =

Lake in the state of Wisconsin, United States

- Location within Wisconsin Location within the United States
- Location: Vilas County, Wisconsin
- Coordinates: 45.9508578°N 89.8394024°W
- Type: lake
- Surface area: 3,483 acres (1,410 ha)
- Average depth: 37 feet (11 m)
- Max. depth: 86 feet (26 m)
- Surface elevation: 1,585 feet (483 m)
- Settlements: Marlands, Lac du Flambeau

Fence Lake is a 3,483 acre lake in Vilas County, Wisconsin. The communities of Marlands and Lac du Flambeau border the lake. The fish present in the lake are Muskellunge, Panfish, Largemouth Bass, Smallmouth Bass, Northern Pike, Trout and Walleye.

Fish

- Musky (Common)
- Panfish (Common)
- Smallmouth Bass (Common)
- Northern Pike (Common)
- Walleye (Common)
- Largemouth Bass (Present)
- Trout (Present)

== See also ==
- List of lakes in Wisconsin
- List of lakes in Vilas County, Wisconsin
