= Ike Walton Lake =

Lake in the state of Wisconsin, United States

- Location within Wisconsin Location within the United States
- Location: Vilas County, Wisconsin
- Coordinates: 46.0359352°N 89.8062374°W
- Type: lake
- Surface area: 1,417 acres (573 ha)
- Average depth: 10 feet (3.0 m)
- Max. depth: 61 feet (19 m)
- Surface elevation: 1,614 feet (492 m)
- Settlements: Lac du Flambeau

Ike Walton Lake is a 1,417 acre lake in Vilas County, Wisconsin. The fish present in the lake are Muskellunge, Panfish, Largemouth Bass, Smallmouth Bass, and Walleye. There is one boat ramp in a small bay on the western shore.

== See also ==
- List of lakes in Wisconsin
- List of lakes in Vilas County, Wisconsin
