= Caspian Lake =

Caspian Lake may refer to:

- Caspian Lake (Vermont), also referred to as Lake Caspian, located in Greensboro, Vermont
- Caspian Lake (Wisconsin), a 17-acre lake located in Vilas County, Wisconsin

== See also ==
- Caspian Sea
