= Crawling Stone Lake =

Lake in Vilas County, Wisconsin, United States

- Location within Wisconsin Location within the United States
- Location: Vilas County, Wisconsin
- Coordinates: 45°56′18″N 89°53′02″W
- Type: Drainage Lake
- Basin countries: United States
- Surface area: 1,483 acres (600 ha)
- Average depth: 31 ft (9.4 m)
- Max. depth: 87 ft (27 m)
- Surface elevation: 1,581 ft (482 m)
- Settlements: Lac du Flambeau

Crawling Stone Lake is a 1,483 acres (600 ha) lake located in Vilas County, Wisconsin, United States. It has a maximum depth of 87 feet (27 m). Fish in the lake include Muskellunge, Panfish, Largemouth Bass, Smallmouth Bass, Northern Pike and Walleye. Little Crawling Stone Lake is attached through a small inlet on the south western side of the lake.

== See also ==
- List of lakes in Wisconsin
- List of lakes in Vilas County, Wisconsin
