= William R. Yeschek =

American businessman and politician

William R. Yeschek Sr. (January 22, 1896 – April 16, 1967) was an American businessman and politician.

Born in New Bedford, Massachusetts, Yeschek was educated in Chicago, Illinois and went to the Chicago Business School. He was director of the Hill State Bank in Chicago. He was in the real estate and resort business and operated a general store in Lac du Flambeau, Wisconsin. Yeschek was the town chairman of Lac du Flambeau and also served on the Vilas County, Wisconsin Board of Supervisors. During the 1949 session, Yeschek served in the Wisconsin State Assembly and was a Republican. In 1967, Yeschek was killed in an automobile accident in Lac du Flambeau when his car hit a tree.
