= Phelps, Wisconsin =

- Town
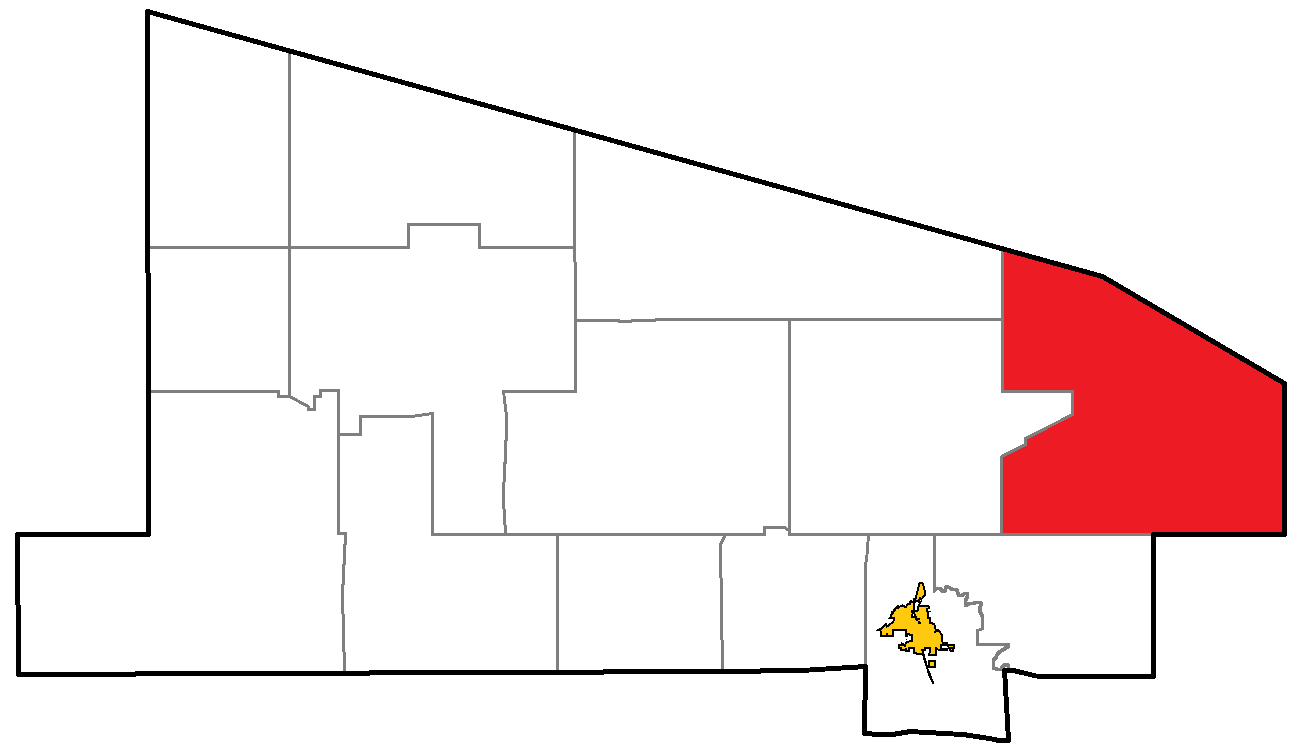
- Location of Phelps, within Vilas County
- Coordinates: 46°3′36″N 89°5′27″W
- Country: United States
- State: Wisconsin
- County: Vilas

Area
  - Total: 108.8 sq mi (281.8 km^{2})
  - Land: 94.9 sq mi (245.7 km^{2})
  - Water: 14.0 sq mi (36.2 km^{2})
- Elevation: 1,736 ft (529 m)

Population (2020)
  - Total: 1,238
  - Density: 13.05/sq mi (5.039/km^{2})
- Time zone: UTC-6 (Central (CST))
  - Summer (DST): UTC-5 (CDT)
- Area codes: 715 & 534
- FIPS code: 55-62425
- GNIS feature ID: 1583917
- Website: https://phelpswi.gov/

Phelps is a town in Vilas County, Wisconsin, United States. The population was 1,238 in 2020. The unincorporated community of Phelps is located in the town.

== Demographics ==
As of the Census Bureau's American Community Survey in December 2019, there were 1,010 people, a drop of 15.8% since 2010, with an average of 2.4 people per household. The population density was 11 people per square mile (4.3/km^{2}). The racial makeup of the town was 92.8% White, 1.6% Native American, 1.1% Asian, 1% African American, and 3.5% from other or two or more races. Hispanic or Latino of any race were 3.2% of the population.

Phelps is made up mostly of families, and it has an abnormally high widowed population. Most households (61%) in the town are families. 82% of head of households in families were married couples, 15% were single females, and 3% were single females. 61% of residents were married, 15% had never married, 13% were divorced, and 11% were widowed.

Phelp has a relatively old population. The age breakdown of the town is 14.4% under the age of 20, 5.3% from 20 to 29, 5.3% from 30 to 39, 6.6% from 40 to 49, 18.4% from 50 to 59, 23.9% from 60 to 69, and 26% over the age of 70. The median age was 60 years. 52% of the population is male and 48% of the population is female.

The median income for a household in Phelps was $40,060. Males had a median income of $48,393 versus $36,806 for females. The average hours worked per week was 34.6. 52% of income was from wages, 5% was earned from self-employment, 27% from investments and retirement income, and 16% from social security. This distribution of income sources is similar to that of the county, but compared to the nation as a whole, wages are a significantly smaller percent of Phelps income. Cost of living in the town is mostly similar to the American average. 151 people in Phelps live below the poverty line.

92% of the population held high school degrees, and 22% held a bachelor's degree or higher. The Phelps School district contains a high school and an elementary school, and 18 other schools are in the Phelps area, including Northwoods Community Secondary School, a charter school.

== Geography ==
The Town of Phelps is located in the northeast corner of Vilas County along the border with Michigan. The headwaters of the Wisconsin River are in the northwestern corner of the town at Lac Vieux Desert. Much of the town is a part of the Chequamegon-Nicolet National Forest. According to the United States Census Bureau, the town has a total area of 108.8 square miles (281.8 km^{2}), of which 94.9 square miles (245.7 km^{2}) is land and 14.0 square miles (36.2 km^{2}) (12.83%) is water.

== Climate ==
The climate is described as Humid Continental by the Köppen Climate System, abbreviated as Dfb.

Climate data for Phelps, Wisconsin
Month	Jan	Feb	Mar	Apr	May	Jun	Jul	Aug	Sep	Oct	Nov	Dec	Year
Mean daily maximum °C (°F)	−7 (20)	−5 (23)	3 (37)	11 (52)	18 (64)	23 (73)	26 (78)	23 (74)	19 (67)	12 (54)	3 (38)	−3 (26)	11 (51)
Mean daily minimum °C (°F)	−19 (−2)	−19 (−2)	−14 (7)	−3 (26)	2 (35)	8 (46)	11 (51)	8 (47)	5 (41)	1 (33)	−6 (21)	−13 (8)	−3 (26)
Average precipitation mm (inches)	30 (1.2)	25 (1)	38 (1.5)	58 (2.3)	81 (3.2)	100 (4.1)	94 (3.7)	100 (4)	99 (3.9)	66 (2.6)	51 (2)	36 (1.4)	780 (30.8)
Source: Weatherbase

== Culture ==
Several hunting and fishing clubs are located in Phelps, including the historic Big Sand Lake Club. Resorts and recreation centered around the town's many lakes are very popular, as are activities such as hiking and camping in the Chequamegon-Nicolet National Forest. Other events include a large softball tournament held every summer in Wavering Park, and a fireworks display over the lake for Independence Day, in which many people partake from boats.

== History ==
The area that is today Phelps was originally inhabited by the Chippewa Indian people. In the early 18th century, French trappers and fur traders settled in the area. Lac Vieux Desert served as a crossroads for this trade. Due to the abundance of healthy forest in the area, the logging business first arrived to exploit this resource in 1896. A large Finnish population moved to the town, significantly increasing its population, between 1906 and 1912. The town was originally named Hackley, but was renamed to Phelps in 1912 after William Phelps, a partner in the Hackley, Phelps & Bonnell Company.

== Transportation ==
Phelps is served by Wisconsin Highway 17 (WIS 17), three Vilas County trunk highways, and a large network of town and Forest Highways. WIS 17 runs southwest–northeast across the town, through the unincorporated community of Phelps and to the Michigan border and a connection to Forest Highway 16 near Smokey Lake. This also provides a connection to Iron River, Michigan, via Iron County Road 436. To the southwest, WIS 17 connects to US Highway 45/WIS 32 and the rest of the Wisconsin State Highway System approximately 4 miles (6.4 km) north of Eagle River. County Trunk Highway E (CTH-E) begins in the Central business district of the unincorporated community of Phelps and runs northwest to serve the area around Lac Vieux Desert before ending at US 45/WIS 32 approximately 2 miles (3.2 km) south of Land o' Lakes. CTH-K follows the north shore of North Twin Lake and provides a connection to Conover and points west, while CTH-A begins at WIS 17 approximately 1.5 miles (2.4 km) east of the unincorporated community of Phelps and leads south and east to its terminus at WIS 55 in the community of Nelma in Forest County.

== Healthcare ==
There are 22.4 primary care physicians per 100,000 population in Phelps compared to the statewide average of 75.6. The area is located in both a mental health and primary care Health Professional Shortage Area (HPSA) qualifying the area as a medical desert. By the year 2035, Phelps is expected to have a 69.1% deficit in physicians, the fourth largest predicted deficit in Wisconsin. There are no behavioral health physicians in Phelps.

== See also ==
- List of towns in Wisconsin
