= Mamie Lake (Wisconsin) =

Lake in Vilas County Wisconsin

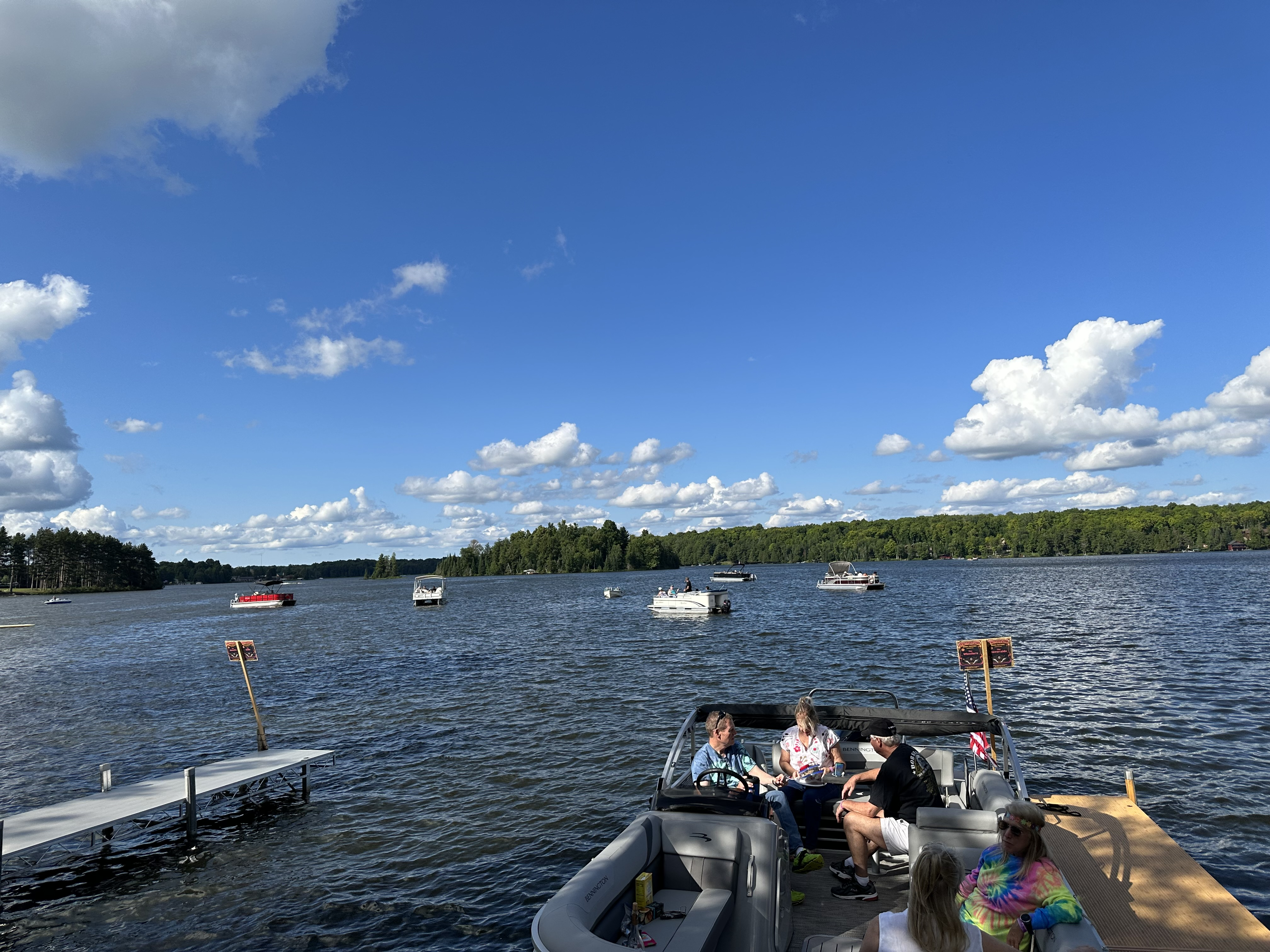
- Mamie Lake in Land O' Lakes, Wisconsin looking North from Bent's Camp

- Mamie Lake Mamie Lake (the United States)
- Location: Land o' Lakes Vilas County, Wisconsin US
- Coordinates: 46.190833°N 89.393611°W
- Type: Inland lake
- Part of: Cisco Chain of Lakes
- Surface area: 376 acres (152 ha)
- Max. depth: 10 ft (3.0 m)
- Islands: Belle Island
- Settlements: Land o' Lakes, Wisconsin

Mamie Lake is an inland lake located in Land o' Lakes, Vilas County, Wisconsin. It is one of the main lakes on the ten lake Cisco Chain of Lakes.

The lake is in both Wisconsin and the Upper Peninsula of Michigan. It is 10 ft (3.0 m) deep and covers 376 acres (152 ha).

== Background ==
In 1919, a writer named Dr. Bessy surveyed the lake from his base at Bent's Camp Resort. In his examination of the flora, he determined that Mamie and the other lakes and landforms in the area were formed by a glacier which created a dump moraine. Trees around the lake are mainly hemlock and yellow birch. The lake is the southernmost of the ten lakes on the Cisco Chain.

== Description ==
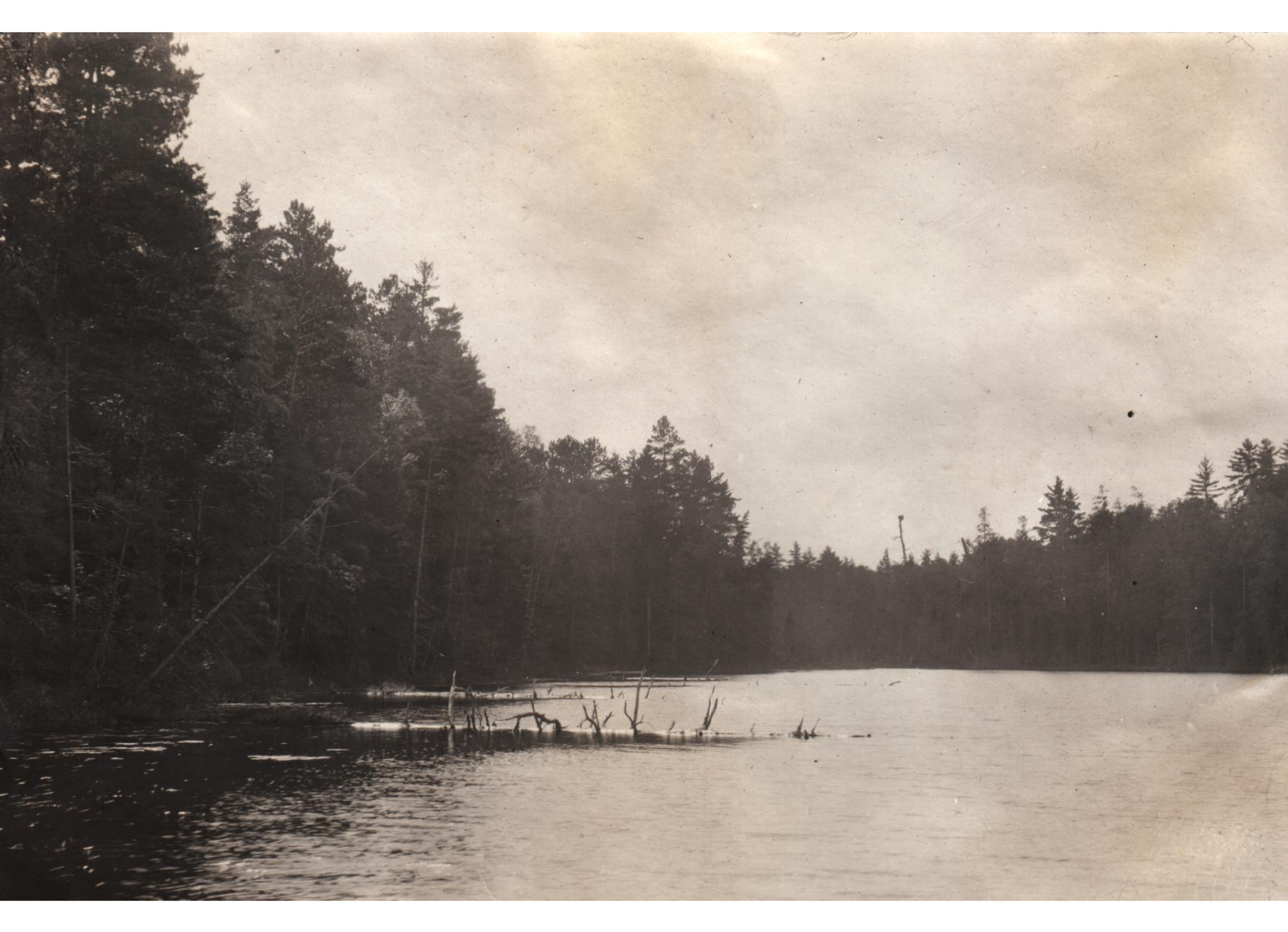
1904 image of Mamie Lake

Mamie Lake is one of the main lakes on the ten lake Cisco Chain of Lakes in northern Wisconsin. The lake is in Vilas County, Wisconsin. It is on the border between Wisconsin and the Upper Peninsula of Michigan. The lake has a depth of 10 ft (3.0 m), and it is 376 acres (152 ha).

== Bent's Camp ==
Bent's Camp Resort was the first resort established on Mamie Lake. In 1893 it was developed from what was an obsolete logging camp into a tourist recreation location. Campgrounds were added three years later, and a restaurant was added in 1906.

The camp is named for its first owner, Charles Bent, who continued to operate it into the 1940s.

An annual music festival called Northwoodstock is held at the location. The resort was featured in a 2023 episode of America's Best Restaurants Roadshow.

== See also ==
- List of lakes of Michigan
- List of lakes of Vilas County, Wisconsin
