= Presque Isle Lake =

Lake in Vilas County, Wisconsin

- Location within Wisconsin Location within the United States
- Location: Vilas County, Wisconsin, United States
- Coordinates: 46.2242°N 89.7806°W
- Type: Natural
- Surface area: 1,165 acres (4,710,000 m^{2})
- Max. depth: 103 feet (31 m)

Presque Isle Lake is a 1,165-acre (471 ha) lake in the town of Presque Isle, in Vilas County, Wisconsin. It is a recreational lake with sport fishing. Native Americans also spearfish on the lake.

== History ==
The lake is 103 feet (31 m) deep. The lake is known for sport fishing muskellunge.

Chippewa Indians exercise their federally protected treaty rights to spearfish walleye on the lake. The activity draws protests from the local residents. The Lac De Flambeau Chippewa Indians were able to spear 449 Walleye from the lake in 1987.

== See also ==
- List of lakes of Vilas County, Wisconsin
- List of lakes in Wisconsin
- Wisconsin Walleye War
