= Sparkling Lake (Wisconsin) =

Lake in the state of Wisconsin, United States

- Location within Wisconsin
- Location: Vilas County, Wisconsin
- Coordinates: 46°00′31″N 89°41′59″W
- Type: Lake
- Basin countries: United States
- Surface area: 157 acres (0.64 km^{2})
- Max. depth: 60 ft (18 m)
- Surface elevation: 1,624 ft (495 m)

Sparkling Lake is a lake in Vilas County, Wisconsin.Sparkling Lake is a 157 acres (64 ha) lake located in Vilas County. It has a maximum depth of 60 feet (18 m).

== See also ==
- List of lakes in Vilas County, Wisconsin
