= Wilson Lake (Iron County, Wisconsin) =

- Location within Wisconsin
- Location: Iron County, Wisconsin
- Coordinates: 46.118°N 90.115°W
- Type: lake

Wilson Lake is located in Iron County, outside of Wilson Creek Flowage. It is one of seven lakes in the state with the name Wilson Lake. This particular lake is a popular fishing lake 5 miles (8.0 km) from the town of Mercer. With three bays, it has two islands and water feed and drain in the South Bay of the lake. The public boat landing is in the Main Bay on the west side of the lake. The North Bay has the most marsh vegetation. There are many cabins located on the lake for residents and vacationers to the North Woods.
