= WLDF =

Radio station in Lac du Flambeau, Wisconsin

- Lac du Flambeau, Wisconsin; United States
- Broadcast area: Lac du Flambeau area; Northern Wisconsin
- Frequency: 92.9 MHz
- Branding: 92.9 The Torch

Programming
- Language: English
- Format: Adult album alternative

Ownership
- Owner: Lac du Flambeau Band of Lake Superior Chippewa; (L.D.F. Business Development Corp.)

History
- First air date: January 1, 2025
- Call sign meaning: Lac du Flambeau

Technical information
- Licensing authority: FCC
- Facility ID: 777026
- Class: A
- ERP: 6,000 watts
- HAAT: 67 meters (220 ft)

Links
- Public license information: Public file; LMS
- Webcast: Listen live
- Website: 929thetorch.com

WLDF (92.9 FM), branded as "92.9 The Torch", is a radio station in Lac du Flambeau, Wisconsin, United States. The station is owned by L.D.F. Business Development Corporation, an entity of the Lac du Flambeau Band of Lake Superior Chippewa tribe.

== History ==
In 2024, WXPR reported that the Lac du Flambeau Business Development Corporation was launching a new radio station called The Torch, describing plans for locally focused programming including music, community information, and cultural programming.

The station received a license to cover from the Federal Communications Commission in 2025.

== Programming ==
WXPR described WLDF as a general market adult alternative radio station, focused primarily on a variety of popular genres, but also incorporating native contemporary and tribal/pow-wow music. While The Torch reflects popular culture, the station also includes teachings and humor derived from traditional Ojibwe culture.

== Technical information ==
WLDF broadcasts on 92.9 MHz and is licensed as a Class A FM facility (Facility ID 777026). Industry reporting has listed the station operating parameters as 6 kW ERP at 67 meters (220 ft) HAAT. FCC database aggregators reflecting LMS data list WLDF on Channel 225A with 6 kW and 67 m (220 ft) HAAT.

The Torch is also available on all media delivery platforms including Alexa, iHeartRadio, Live365, Zeno Media and by tablets, Smart TV, and all mobile devices via the radio station's app.

Additionally, The Torch broadcasts a live, simulcast video stream available 24/7 on its website, YouTube and various social media streaming services.
