= Lost Lake (Vilas County, Wisconsin) =

Lake in the state of Wisconsin, United States

- Location within Wisconsin Location within the United States
- Location: Vilas County, Wisconsin
- Coordinates: 45°57′54″N 89°29′00″W
- Basin countries: United States
- Surface area: 544 acres (220 ha)
- Max. depth: 22 ft (6.7 m)
- Surface elevation: 1,591 ft (485 m)

Lost Lake is located in the town of St. Germain, in Vilas County, Wisconsin, United States. It is 544 acres (2.20 km^{2}) in size and has a maximum depth of 22 feet (6.7 m). Visitors have access to the lake from a public boat landing. Fish include Musky, Panfish, Largemouth Bass, Northern Pike and Walleye.
