= North Twin Lake (Phelps, Wisconsin) =

Lake in Vilas County, Wisconsin

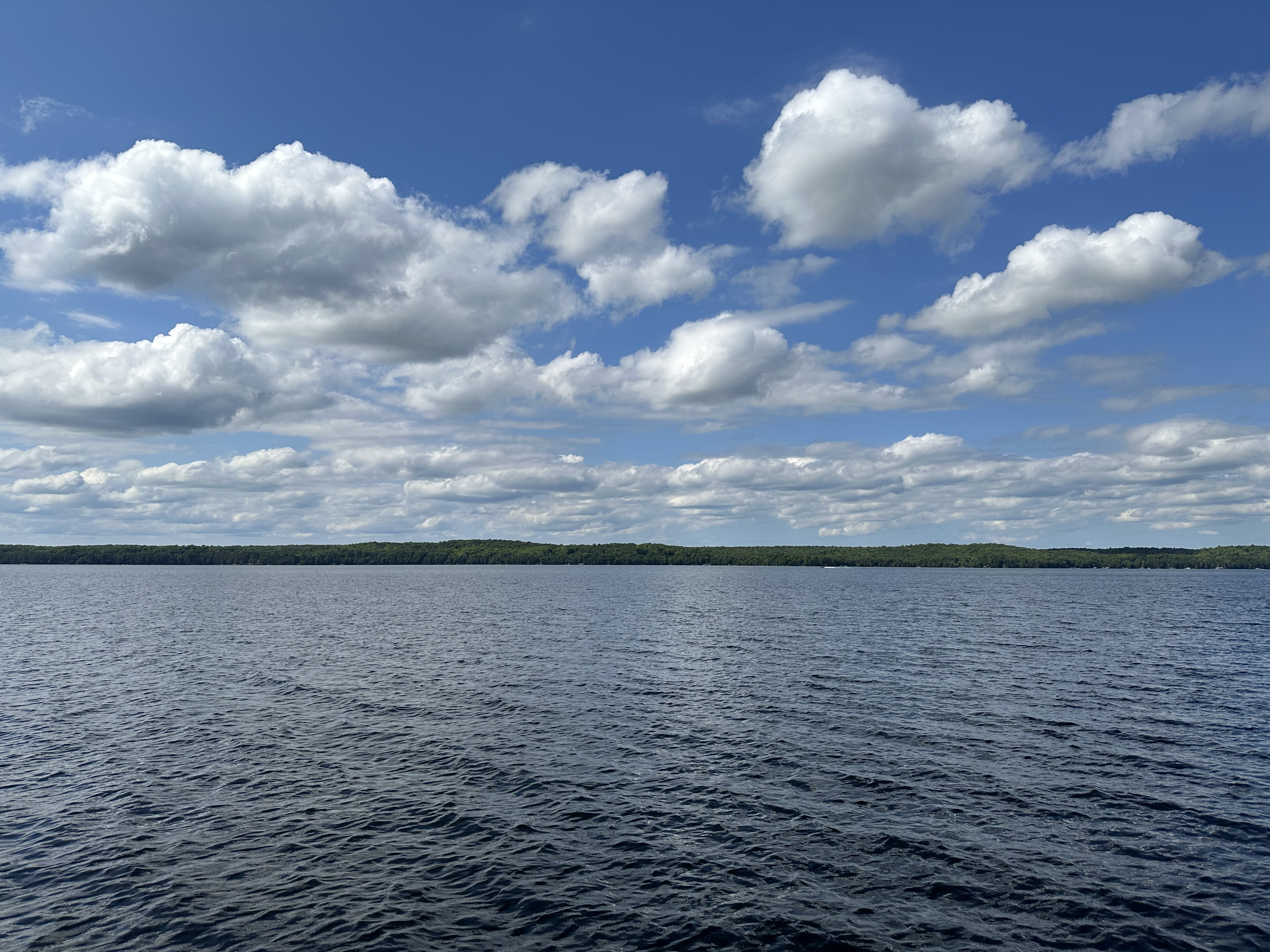
- North Twin Lake looking north

- Location within Wisconsin Location within the United States
- Location: Vilas County, Wisconsin, U.S.
- Coordinates: 46.05°N 89.135°W
- Type: Natural
- Surface area: 2,871 acres (11,620,000 m^{2})
- Max. depth: 60 feet (18 m)
- Shore length^{1}: 10 mi (16 km)
- Islands: Gangster Island
- ^{1} Shore length is not a well-defined measure.

North Twin Lake is a 2,871-acre (1,162 ha) lake (formerly known as Big Twin lake in the town of Phelps, in Vilas County, Wisconsin. It is a recreational lake with sport fishing. Native Americans also exercise their federally protected treaty rights to spearfish on the lake.

== History ==
The lake is mainly a sport fishing lake with muskellunge and bass. Recreation on this lake also includes sail racing. Native American tribes spear fish in North Twin Lake and elsewhere in Vilas county based on their federally protected treaty rights. The spear fishing activities are often a source of friction between Native Americans and local residents.

=== Island ===
Gangster Island is located in the southwest portion of North Twin lake (originally known as Big Twin Lake) in the town of Phelps in Vilas County, Wisconsin. According to real estate listings the island covers roughly 10 acres (4.0 ha).

== See also ==
- List of lakes of Vilas County, Wisconsin
- List of lakes in Wisconsin
- Wisconsin Walleye War
