= Gangster Island =

Private lake island in Wisconsin

Native name: Schafner's Island
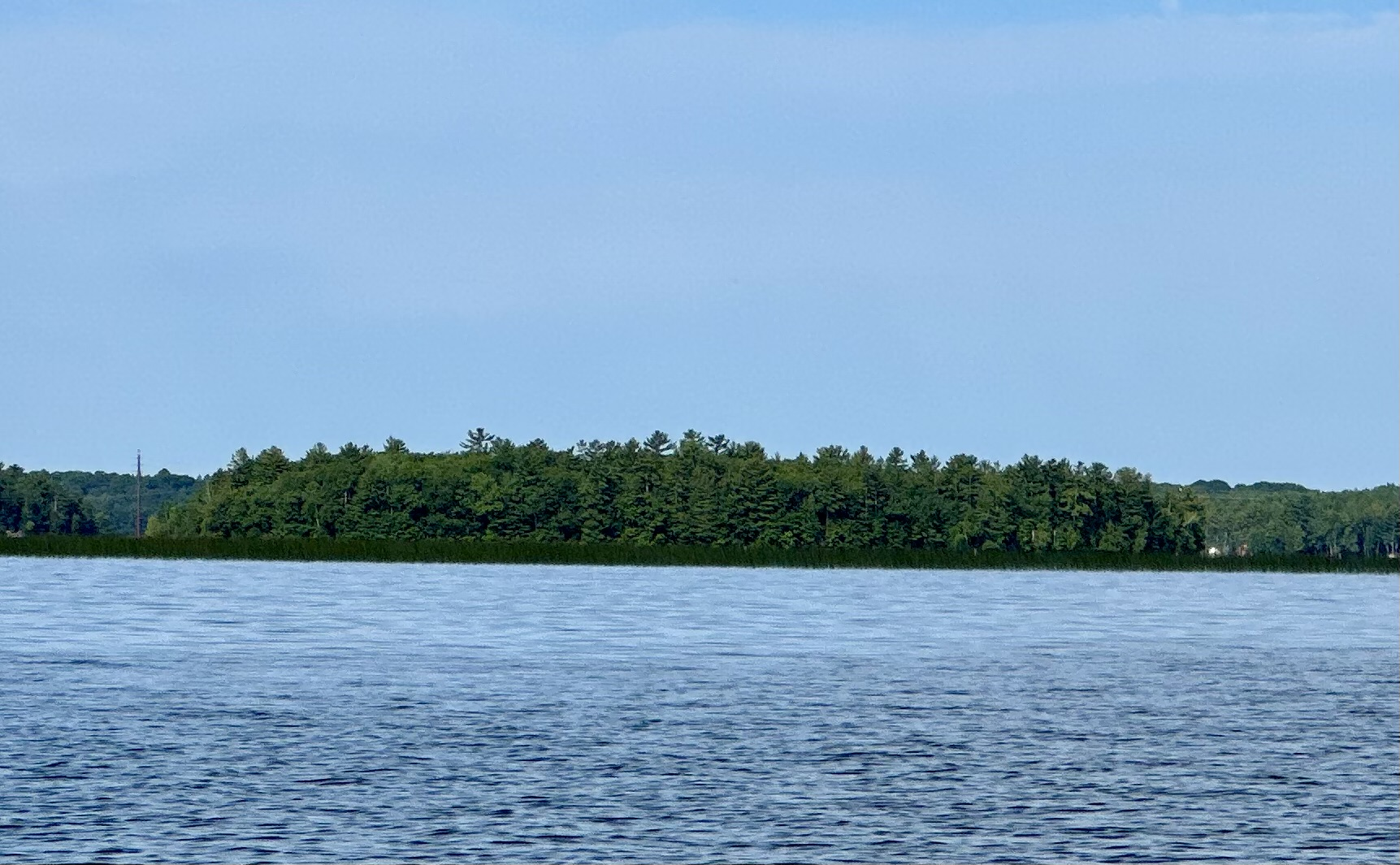
- Schafner's Island North Twin Lake Vilas County Wisconsin

- Location on a map of Wisconsin Island (the United States)

Geography
- Location: Vilas County, Wisconsin US
- Coordinates: 46.040833°N 89.151944°W
- Adjacent to: North Twin Lake (Phelps, Wisconsin) US
- Total islands: 1
- Area: 4.05 ha (10.0 acres)

Administration
- Private

Gangster Island is a private island located within North Twin Lake (Phelps, Wisconsin). The local folklore is that an Al Capone associate owned the island at some point and the story led to the island being dubbed Gangster Island. As of 2020 the property was owned by Gangster Island LLC.

== Background ==
Gangster island is located in the southwest portion of North Twin lake (originally known as Big Twin Lake). The lake is in the town of Phelps in Vilas County, Wisconsin. According to real estate listings the island covers roughly 10 acres (4.0 ha).

The Wisconsin Department of Natural Resources surveyed the island in 2002. They determined that the island had "unique aesthetics", and an "outstanding NSB rating". They also determined that the shoreline was undeveloped and it was habitat for animals.

== History ==
In 1895 the owner of the island was Robert Stewart. Stewart sold the island to Chicago resident and lawyer C.B. Schafner. The Chicago resident built a summer home there some time before 1902. The Eagle River Review reported that Schafner's home plans called for a 40 foot square two story home. His plans for the island also included a boathouse. Schafner was arrested and fined US$25 in 1902 for killing deer out of season. The summer home that Schafner built there was burglarized in 1908 and he offered a US$50 reward to catch and prosecute the burglars. Schafner occupied the island sporadically and in 1921 it was sold to a resort operator named A.H. Adams. Adams had plans to create a resort with cabins. The address of the island is 3870 Pedersen Trail, Phelps, WI 54554. In 1923 the island was then sold to a wealthy Chicago resident named Mr. Bernard. After Bernard's ownership The Wisconsin Land of Lakes Magazine reported that it was purchased by a "group of Chicago men, headed by James D. Ryan".

In the 1940s the island was purchased by John M. Detling. The island was then sold to Carl James Kohler Sr. and he died of an apparent heart attack at the lodge on the island and was found by authorities seated in a chair. Walter J Kohler III and his brother then inherited the island. The Kohler family also referred to it as Arachnid Island because of the many spiders. In 1992 the Kholer's sold the island to Camp Birch Knoll. In 2020 the island was purchased by Gangster Island LLC.

There were rumors that the island's ownership was involved with American gangster Al Capone and that has led to the island being referred to as Gangster Island.

== See also ==
- List of islands of Wisconsin
