= Big Saint Germain Lake =

- Interactive map of Big Saint Germain Lake
- Location: Vilas County, Wisconsin
- Coordinates: 45.934°N 89.521°W
- Type: Lake
- Primary inflows: Lake Content, Lost Creek, Plum Creek, and Mud Creek
- Primary outflows: Fawn Lake
- Surface area: 1,622 acres (656 ha)
- Average depth: ~21 ft (6.4 m)
- Settlements: St. Germain, Wisconsin

The Big St. Germain Lake is a state-owned 1,622-acre (656 ha) glacial drainage lake located in Vilas County, Wisconsin. The lake has a maximum depth of 42 ft (13 m) with an average depth of 21 ft (6.4 m) and is noted for its diverse fish habitat and spring-fed water sources. The lake is located to the north of St. Germain, Wisconsin.

== History ==
The lake was formed during the Last Ice Age as glaciers carved paths through North America and water filled their depressions as the ice retreated. Records from 1857 show that Native Americans were referring to the lake as "St. Germain" with a native burial ground was located on the south shore. It is likely the body got its name from Jean Francois St. Germaine, a French soldier who had married into a local tribe after deserting New France. His descendants are among the Lac du Flambeau band, who influenced the naming of the lake. The lake was historically used by the Ojibwe for a hunting and fishing territory before European settlement.

In the early 20th century, logging, trapping, and tourism became central to the region as more settlers arrived. The lake's natural sand-gravel-muck substrate and spring inflows greatly preserve the water quality. Over time, advanced hydrology efforts linked Big St. Germain to Lake Content to the south-east and Fawn Lake to the south-west, all of which then flow into the St. Germain River System eventually reaching Pickerel Lake. In 2008, local leaders established the Big St. Germain Area Lakes District (BSGALD) to protect water quality and prevent invasive species. There is a state-owned boat launch located on the north shore of the lake, and a 12.6-mile hiking trail surrounds much of the lake.

== Habitat ==
The lake is home to a number of species of animals and plants, as well as amphibians, insects, and birds. The lake provides a habitat to:

=== Aquatic habitat ===
- Muskellunge
- Walleye
- Northern pike
- Largemouth bass
- Smallmouth bass
- Bluegill
- Rock bass
- White suckers
- Blak crappie

=== Waterfowl and shoreline birds ===
- Mallard duck
- Teal duck
- Canada geese
- Bald eagle
- Osprey
- Great blue heron
- Green heron
- Kingfisher

=== Mammals and amphibians ===
- Beaver
- Otter
- Mink
- Raccoon
- Deer
- Black bear
- Frogs
- Toads
- Salamanders
- Snapping turtles
- Painted turtles

=== Invertebrate and plants ===
- Dragonflies
- Damselflies
- Mayflies
- Clams
- Snails
- Coontail
- Waterweed
- Pondweed
