= Murphy Lake (Marinette County, Wisconsin) =

Lake in the state of Wisconsin, United States

- Location within Wisconsin Location within the United States
- Location: Marinette County, Wisconsin
- Coordinates: 45.1314082°N 88.1280763°W
- Primary inflows: Murphy Creek
- Primary outflows: Murphy Creek
- Basin countries: United States
- Surface area: 14 acres (0.022 sq mi; 0.057 km^{2})
- Max. depth: 26 ft (7.9 m)
- Surface elevation: 718 ft (219 m)

Murphy Lake is a lake in Marinette County, Wisconsin. At an elevation of 719 feet (225 m), it contains panfish, largemouth bass, northern pike and trout and has a public boat ramp.
