= Wilson Lake (Wisconsin) =

Lake in the state of Wisconsin, United States

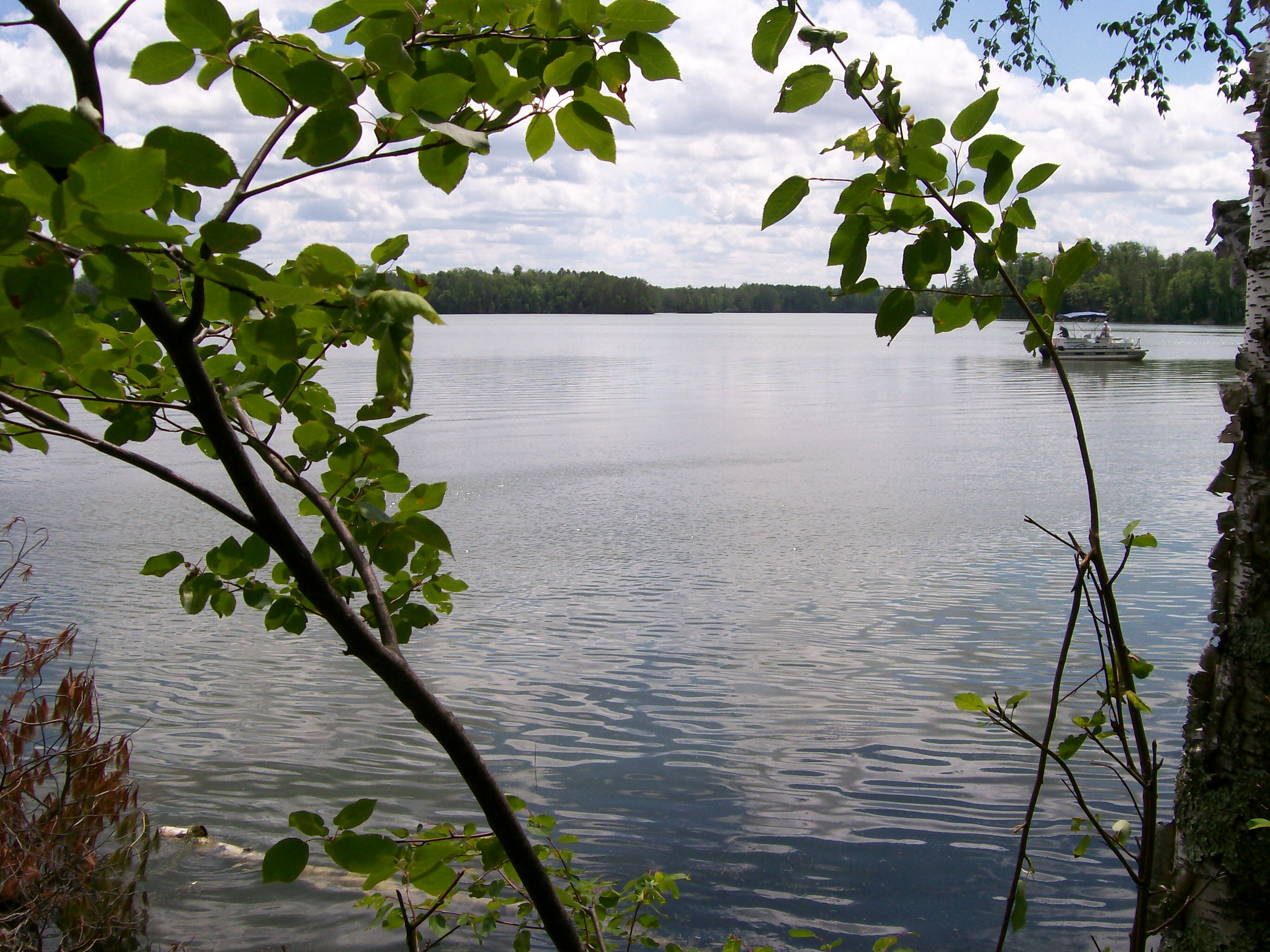

- Location within Wisconsin Location within the United States
- Location: Iron County, Wisconsin
- Coordinates: 46°07′04″N 090°06′57″W
- Basin countries: United States
- Surface area: 162 acres (0.66 km^{2})
- Max. depth: 21 ft (6.4 m)
- Surface elevation: 479 ft (146 m)
- Islands: 2

Wilson Lake is the name of seven lakes in Wisconsin, United States, as well as three flowages and a pond. Below are listed the county, acres, and maximum depth of the lakes.

Lake	County	Surface area	Max. Depth
Wilson	Burnett	11 acres (0.045 km^{2})	13 ft (4.0 m)
Wilson	Douglas	28 acres (0.11 km^{2})	9 ft (2.7 m)
Wilson	Iron	155 acres (0.63 km^{2})	21 ft (6.4 m)
Wilson	Sawyer	103 acres (0.42 km^{2})	14 ft (4.3 m)
Wilson	Shawano	20 acres (0.081 km^{2})	8 ft (2.4 m)
Wilson (Deer)	Vilas	17 acres (0.069 km^{2})	18 ft (5.5 m)
Wilson	Waushara	81 acres (0.33 km^{2})	12 ft (3.7 m)
Wilson Flowage	Price	95 acres (0.38 km^{2})	
Wilson Flowage	Price	162 acres (0.66 km^{2})	6 ft (1.8 m)
Wilson Marsh Flowage	Jackson	35 acres (0.14 km^{2})	9 ft (2.7 m)
Wilson Park Pond	Milwaukee	9 acres (0.036 km^{2})	4.5 ft (1.4 m)
