= Crampton Lake =

Lake in Wisconsin

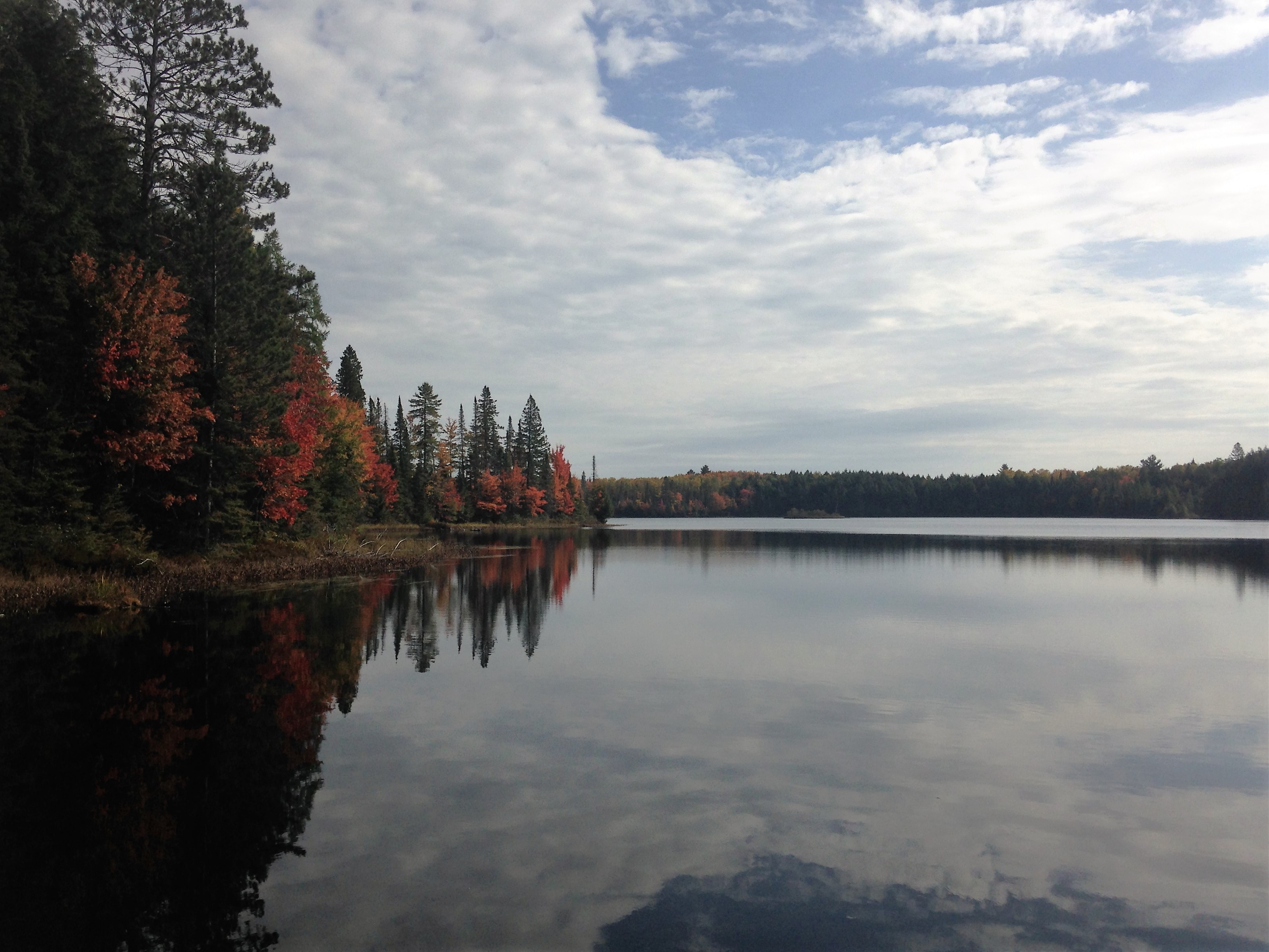
- Crampton Lake, 2015

- Location within Wisconsin
- Coordinates: 46.2097°N 89.4737°W
- Type: Lake
- Basin countries: United States
- Surface area: 0.25 km^{2} (0.097 sq mi)
- Average depth: 4.6 m (15 ft)

Crampton Lake is a lake that is primarily located in Vilas County, Wisconsin. A small portion is in Gogebic County, Michigan. It is found near the town of Land o' Lakes, Wisconsin, and is on land managed by the University of Notre Dame Environmental Research Center.

== Characteristics ==
Crampton Lake is a 0.25 km2 (61 acres) seepage lake. The lake is typically frozen over from November to March.

=== Ecology ===
The area surrounding Crampton Lake is woody wetlands. The most common fish found in the lake include bluegill, largemouth bass, and yellow perch, with smaller populations of central mudminnow, Johnny darter, golden shiner, and pumpkinseed also present.
