= Star Lake (Vilas County, Wisconsin) =

Lake in the state of Wisconsin, United States

- Location within Wisconsin Location within the United States
- Location: Vilas County, Wisconsin
- Coordinates: 46.025229°N 89.492365°W
- Type: Drainage lake
- Basin countries: United States
- Surface area: 1,206 acres (4.88 km^{2})
- Average depth: 23 ft (7.0 m)
- Max. depth: 68 ft (21 m)
- Surface elevation: 1,673 ft (510 m)

Star Lake is a lake in Vilas County, Wisconsin, United States. The lake covers an area of 1,206 acres (4.88 km^{2}) and reaches a maximum depth of 68 ft (21 m). Visitors have access to the lake from public boat landings. The community of Star Lake, Wisconsin is located on the lake's northeast shore. Fish species enzootic to Star Lake include bluegill, largemouth bass, muskellunge, northern pike, smallmouth bass, and walleye.
