= Lake Noquebay =

Freshwater lake in Wisconsin, US

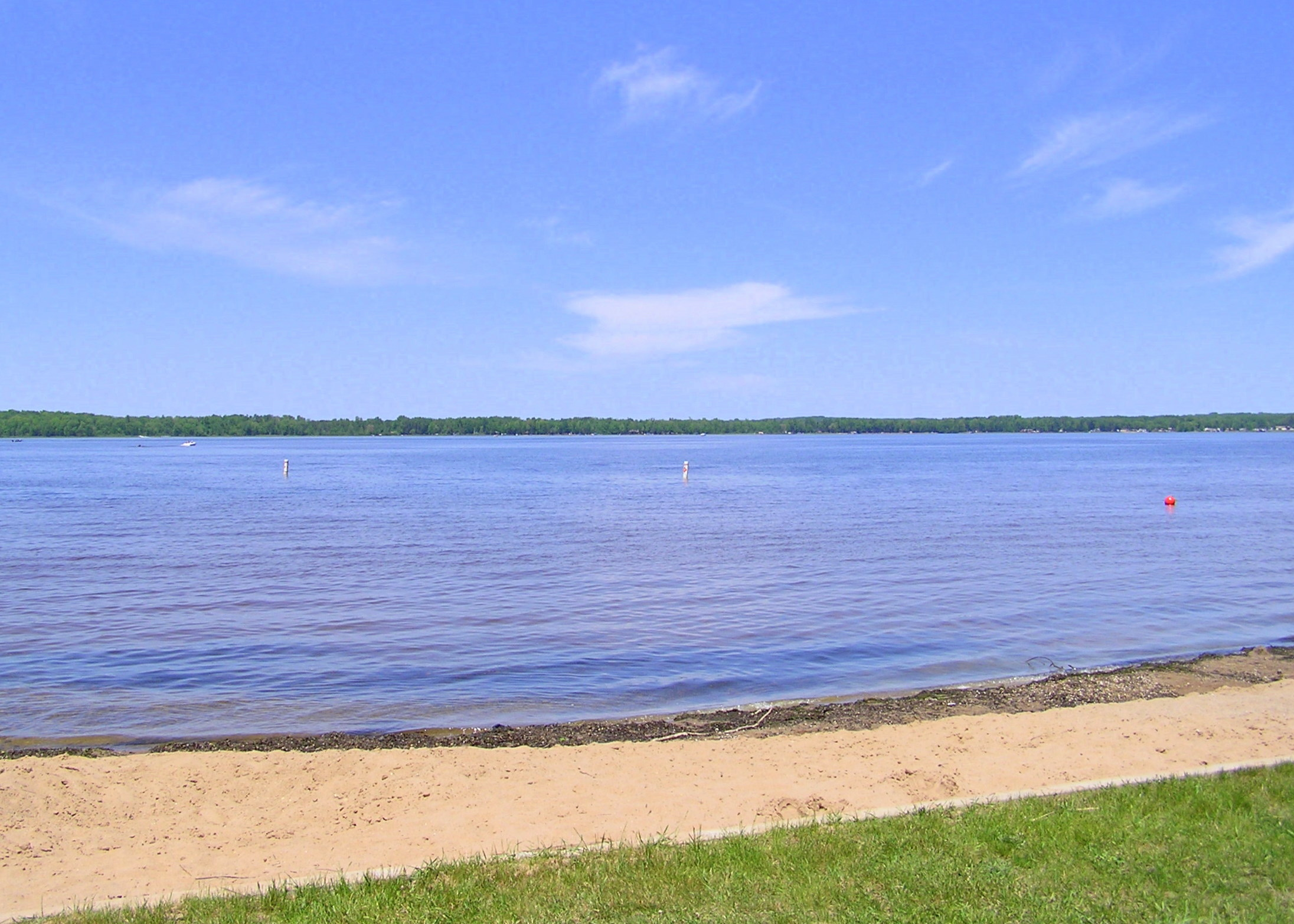
- Lake Noquebay

- Location within Wisconsin Location within the United States
- Location: Marinette County, Wisconsin, United States
- Coordinates: 45.25661650°N 87.90839120°W
- Type: Drainage
- Primary inflows: Middle Inlet, Lower Middle Inlet, Upper Inlet
- Primary outflows: Peshtigo River, The Outlet
- Basin countries: United States
- Managing agency: Wisconsin DNR
- Surface area: 2,398 acres (9.70 km^{2})
- Average depth: 15 feet (4.6 m)
- Max. depth: 51 feet (16 m)
- Water volume: 23,985.54 acre-feet (29,585,730 m^{3})
- Shore length^{1}: 9.8 miles (15.8 km)
- Surface elevation: 659 ft (201 m)
- Islands: East Island, Unnamed Island (designated "LN10")
- Settlements: Crivitz
- ^{1} Shore length is not a well-defined measure.

Lake Noquebay (/ˈnɑːkəbi/ NAH-kə-bee) is a large freshwater lake in northeastern Wisconsin. It is the largest lake in Marinette County. It is located north of Green Bay, Wisconsin, approximately 4 miles (6.4 km) northeast of Crivitz, Wisconsin.

== Name ==
Lake Noquebay was spelled Noque Bay or Nocque Bay in older sources. The name is believed to derive from Ojibwe noka or noke, meaning 'totem of the bear', and is likely a French interpretation to the names of Bay de Noc and the Noquet tribe. The implication of this naming would suggest that this area was important to the Noquet tribe's bear clan.

== History ==
The Lake Noquebay Wildlife area was acquired by the Wisconsin Department of Natural Resources (WDNR) in 1960 from Marinette County. The WDNR manages the wildlife and structures within this area. Changes include creation of two flowages and removal of a control structure.

== Statistics ==
The lake is approximately 2 miles (3.2 km) by 4 miles (6.4 km) and has an area of about 2,410 acres (9.8 km^{2}). The nearest settlement to the lake is Crivitz 4 miles (6.4 km) to the southwest. There are three other nearby towns: Wausaukee 8 miles (13 km) to the north, and Pound 12 miles (19 km) and Coleman 13 miles (21 km) to the south-southwest. The lake has three small tributaries: Upper Inlet, Middle Inlet, and Lower Middle Inlet. Smith Creek is a tributary of Lower Middle Inlet.

The Lake Noquebay Dam, constructed in 1929 at the southwest corner of the lake, maintains the water level between 664.95 feet (202.68 m) and 666.2 feet (203.1 m); the dam is officially known as the Lake Noquebay WP301 Dam or SENW Dam. The Lake Noquebay Wildlife Area 2WP1975 Dam is located 1 mile (1.6 km) east of the lake on Upper Inlet.

Boating is accessible via four landings, including a fishing pier at the north access. The lake is historically noted for its large population of bluegills, making up approximately 70% of panfish. These bluegill are naturally maintained and require no intervention to sustain their size and abundance.

== Water quality ==
Lake Noquebay's average summer trophic level is 49, based on the measurements taken in the past five years with a Secchi disk. This is considered to be average for this type of lake. Historical data beginning in 1993 show a rise in trophic level that has not culminated in any significant shift. The coloration of the water is slightly opaque, indicating that it is slightly alkaline. This is likely due to the chlorophyll averages of 6 μg/L (2.7×10^{−6} gr/U.S. fl oz) in summer caused by algal blooms. Another indicator, total phosphorus, averaged 19.4 μg/L (8.9×10^{−6} gr/U.S. fl oz) in summer, allowing for an insignificant but noticeable algal bloom. The Trophic state index measured suggests a mesotrophic lake, and all other data correlate with an average lake of this type. The littoral substrate is composed of 5% exposed gravel/rock, 25% muck, and 70% sand.

== Climate ==
Data from 1971 to 2000 have been collected showing average monthly high and low and temperatures along with average annual precipitation. The average temperature trend reaches its highest in July, at 79.9 °F (26.6 °C), and its lowest in January, at 0.1 °F (−17.7 °C). The average precipitation trend is highest in September, at 3.71 inches (9.4 cm), and lowest in February, at 0.89 inches (2.3 cm).

Climate of Lake Noquebay
Month	Avg High Temp ^{A}	Avg Low Temp ^{A}	Avg Precipitation ^{B}
Jan	23.9 °F (−4.5 °C)	0.1 °F (−17.7 °C)	1.18 inches (3.0 cm)
Feb	28.9 °F (−1.7 °C)	4.6 °F (−15.2 °C)	0.89 inches (2.3 cm)
March	39.1 °F (3.9 °C)	16.1 °F (−8.8 °C)	1.88 inches (4.8 cm)
April	53.6 °C (128.5 °F)	28.2 °C (82.8 °F)	2.49 inches (6.3 cm)
May	67.9 °F (19.9 °C)	39.5 °F (4.2 °C)	3.26 inches (8.3 cm)
June	76.1 °F (24.5 °C)	49.1 °F (9.5 °C)	3.51 inches (8.9 cm)
July	79.9 °F (26.6 °C)	53.8 °F (12.1 °C)	3.29 inches (8.4 cm)
Aug	77.6 °F (25.3 °C)	52.7 °F (11.5 °C)	3.67 inches (9.3 cm)
Sept	68.6 °F (20.3 °C)	43.4 °F (6.3 °C)	3.71 inches (9.4 cm)
Oct	56.6 °F (13.7 °C)	32.3 °F (0.2 °C)	2.27 inches (5.8 cm)
Nov	40.5 °F (4.7 °C)	21.0 °F (−6.1 °C)	2.19 inches (5.6 cm)
Dec	28.1 °F (−2.2 °C)	8.0 °F (−13.3 °C)	1.49 inches (3.8 cm)

^AThe average temperatures were originally recorded in degrees Fahrenheit.
^BThe average precipitation was originally recorded in inches.

== Fish ==
A 2014 fish management report shows a sample of 8,941 fish representing 20 species and 1 hybrid in Lake Noquebay.

Fish Species Abundance ^{A}
Name	Amount collected ^{C}	Avg size	Min size	Max Size
Bluegill ^{B}	5,222 (58%)	6.3 inches (160 mm)	2.4 inches (61 mm)	10.1 inches (260 mm)
Black crappie	1,344 (15%)	7.6 inches (190 mm)	4.6 inches (120 mm)	12.5 inches (320 mm)
Northern pike	482 (5%)	18.4 inches (470 mm)	9.5 inches (240 mm)	34.5 inches (880 mm)
Walleye	287 (3%)	17 inches (430 mm)	5.4 inches (140 mm)	24.7 inches (630 mm)
Largemouth bass	200 (2%)	12.3 inches (310 mm)	5.8 inches (150 mm)	17.9 inches (450 mm)

^A Additionally yellow perch, hybrid fish, bullhead species (yellow, black, and brown), various sucker and redhorse species were collected. The data above account for over 83% of fish sampled.
^BAge ranged from 2 to 10 years.
^C Fish populations have been maintained by stocking. It is noted, however, that natural reproduction of walleye was reported at very low levels. Warm waters cause walleye to move in and out of spawning areas for longer time periods.

== Aquatic plants ==
There are about 32 aquatic plant species in Lake Noquebay according to a 2007 aquatic plant survey. The abundant plant species discovered at about 40% of the sample are bushy pondweed (Najas flexilis), variable-leaf watermilfoil (Myriophyllum heterophyllum), and muskgrass (Chara (alga) sp.) The aquatic species found at 18% of the sample include large-leaf pondweed (Potamogeton amplifolius), coontail (Ceratophyllum demersum), Illinois pondweed (Potamogeton illinoensis), variable-leaf pondweed (Potamogeton gramineus), and flat-stem pondweed (Potamogeton zosteriformis).

Attached to clam shells and attached to stems of variable-leaf milfoil are zebra mussels (Dreissena polymorpha) throughout the lake. In shallow water there are banded mystery snails (Viviparus georgianus), feeding on algae and detritus in sediment.

== Maintenance ==
A non-profit 501(c)(3) organization, the Lake Noquebay Anglers Partnership, is dedicated and committed to improving Lake Noquebay's public use by making improvement efforts toward fish population and habitat, water quality, public access (regular and handicap), and recreational use. Lake Noquebay's Anglers Partnership Inc. was created in November 2013. The organization stocked 7,000 yellow perch ranging from 5 to 7 inches in October 2019. As of February 2020, over 10,000 yellow perch have been stocked. The Wisconsin Walleye Initiative, overseen by Lake Noquebay's Anglers Partnership and Wisconsin DNR, stocked 12,000 walleye in September 2016 and 12,000 walleye in October 2018. Walleye stocked were 6 to 8 inches. The funding provided to the Wisconsin Walleye Initiative is used in part with the Summer Tribal Youth Program, providing tribal youth opportunities to work with conservation projects such as the initiative. Additionally, in 2015 a handicap accessible fishing pier was repaired on the north shore of the lake. This was funded by donations through these organizations. A Boat launch was promoted by the installation of a handicap accessible public pier in 2017. The non-profit organizations also created a man-made reef in March 2015, to promote walleye spawning.

== Environmental concerns ==
Lake Noquebay is confirmed to contain the banded mystery snail, rusty crayfish, and zebra mussel in its waters as well as non-native phragmites in the surrounding grounds. In addition, Aquatic forget-me-not (Myosotis scorpioides) and Narrow-leaf cattail (Typha angustifolia) have been observed but not verified.

Over 270 homes and four resorts are located on the shorelines of Lake Noquebay. Since 1975 the Lake Noquebay Rehabilitation District manages the plants, pollution run-off, and water quality of the lake. Their responsibilities also include the operations and maintenance of the dam. Their efforts have greatly reduced the phosphorus runoff from nearby farmlands. Historical data show that for several decades phosphorus levels have been increasing with an unknown cause. Phosphorus levels in 2018 were 25–30 μg/L (1.1×10^{−5}–1.4×10^{−5} gr/U.S. fl oz). The aquatic ecosystems of northeast Wisconsin, phosphorus water levels average about 19 micrograms per liter. A nutrient study had been planned for 2018 by the Lake Rehabilitation District to measure the amounts of phosphorus entering the aquatic system and possibly locate the source. The study could take three years to complete and will be partly funded by Wisconsin DNR Lake Management Planning program grant. In June 2020, PFAS-contaminated biosolids were tested in water wells of nearby agricultural fields, which seem to be approaching Lake Noquebay. Four water wells in the area had samples reflecting detection levels above 20 parts per trillion of PFOA and/or PFOS. Two additional water wells had PFAS positive detections that show levels between reporting limit and 20 parts per trillion. Although, these were detected nearby, actual testing of Lake Noquebay was not determined at that time.

== Recreation ==
Lake Noquebay is popular year round with boating, fishing, snowmobiling, water skiing. Lake Noquebay County Park lies on the south shore of the lake and includes picnic areas with grills, a playground, restrooms, a boat launch (with rentals), a sandy beach, and an indoor pavilion with changing booths for swimmers. The Crivitz Ski Cats Waterski Club performs weekly in the summer.

In addition, there is a 1,300-acre wildlife area, including a 662-acre sedge meadow officially designated as a natural area, on the east side of the lake. This area consists mostly of marshy, lowland vegetation with some cedars also present in the swamps. This area is popular for birding, fishing, hunting, trapping, wildlife viewing, and edible plant gathering. In addition, it is used for cross-country skiing, hiking, and snowmobiling, but there is only a defined trail for snowmobiling.

Wisconsin lakes are popular for ice fishing. Lake Noquebay's Fish-O-Rama has been a popular event, that has previously taken place in the brisk cold month of February. This ice fishing event has awarded cash prizes for the catch of the longest fish in seven fish categories. Double prizes have been given for the live release of fish catches.
