= Alma Lake =

Lake in the state of Wisconsin, United States

- Location within Wisconsin Location within the United States
- Location: Vilas County, WI
- Coordinates: 45°54′35″N 89°25′42″W
- Basin countries: United States
- Max. length: 824 m (2,703 ft)
- Max. width: 434 m (1,424 ft)
- Surface area: 233,500 m^{2} (58 acres)
- Average depth: 3.4 m (11 ft)
- Max. depth: 5.5 m (18 ft)
- Water volume: 750,000 m^{3} (0 km^{3})
- Residence time: Approx: 3 years
- Surface elevation: 491 m (0 km)
- Settlements: St. Germain
- References: http://www.almamoonlake.org/wp/wp-content/uploads/TSG_8.1_Alma_Draft_v1.pdf

Alma Lake, located in North-Central Wisconsin in Vilas County, near the town of St. Germain, is a small 57.7-acre (233,500 sq. meters) lake with a maximum depth of 5.5 meters (18 feet), and a mean depth of 3.4 meters (11 feet). The lake bottom is composed of 50% sand, 40% gravel, and 10% mulch. Alma Lake has one public boat landing located on Red Oak Road, off Birchwood Drive. The lake always has a slow, no-wake ordinance.

== History ==
In 1902, the Red Oak Resort was built on Alma Lake by George Jackson. The resort was then purchased by Walter and Wilka deHaas in the 1920s. By the 1960s, Alma Lake was home to three resorts: The Twilight Resort, which was located at the southern end of the lake, Lindquist's Log Cabins, located on the northwestern bay, and deHaas Red Oaks, located on the east side of the southern bowl of the lake. Each business developed a sandy beach on their shorelines for guests; and Red Oaks Resort also operated a small boat livery. All three of the family-owned resorts on Alma Lake were subdivided between 1965 and 1974. Property owners formed the Alma-Moon Lake Association in 1969–1970, and by 1971 the owners had agreed to institute a 5 mph speed limit on Alma Lake.

== Physical aspects ==
Alma Lake is a seepage lake, meaning that it has no inflowing or outflowing streams; however, Alma lake is connected by a channel to Moon Lake. Alma Lake becomes stratified during the summer, turns over and completely mixes in the fall, re-stratifies during winter, and then mixes again during spring. This classifies it as a dimictic lake. In winter, Alma Lake is usually frozen by the end of November and stays frozen until late April to early May with water temperatures dropping to 0 °C just below the ice. The highest recorded temperature in the lake was 27.6 °C in July 2006. Alma Lake has relatively clear, blue water, with Secchi disk depths averaging 3.6 meters (11.9 feet). Secchi depths in Alma Lake have historically been highly correlated with the amount of chlorophyll a in the water. The summer chlorophyll a average is 4.3 ug/L. Like most lakes in northern Wisconsin, Alma lake is phosphorus limited, with a nitrogen:phosphorus ratio of 33:1.

== Wildlife ==
Alma Lake is home to 34 native aquatic plant species including one species listed as a species of special concern by the Wisconsin Natural Heritage Inventory Program, the northeastern bladderwort. The most common plant in Alma Lake is dwarf watermilfoil. The only invasive species that has been identified in Alma Lake is the Chinese mystery snail. Alma Lake has not been affected by zebra mussels, another invasive species, due to its pH of 6.8 and its very low concentration of calcium. Alma Lake is also home to a number of fish including: muskellunge, panfish, largemouth bass, smallmouth bass, walleye, crappie, rock bass, sunfish, bluegill, perch, and northern pike. With intermediate levels of primary production, Alma Lake's trophic status is mesotrophic.

== Human use ==
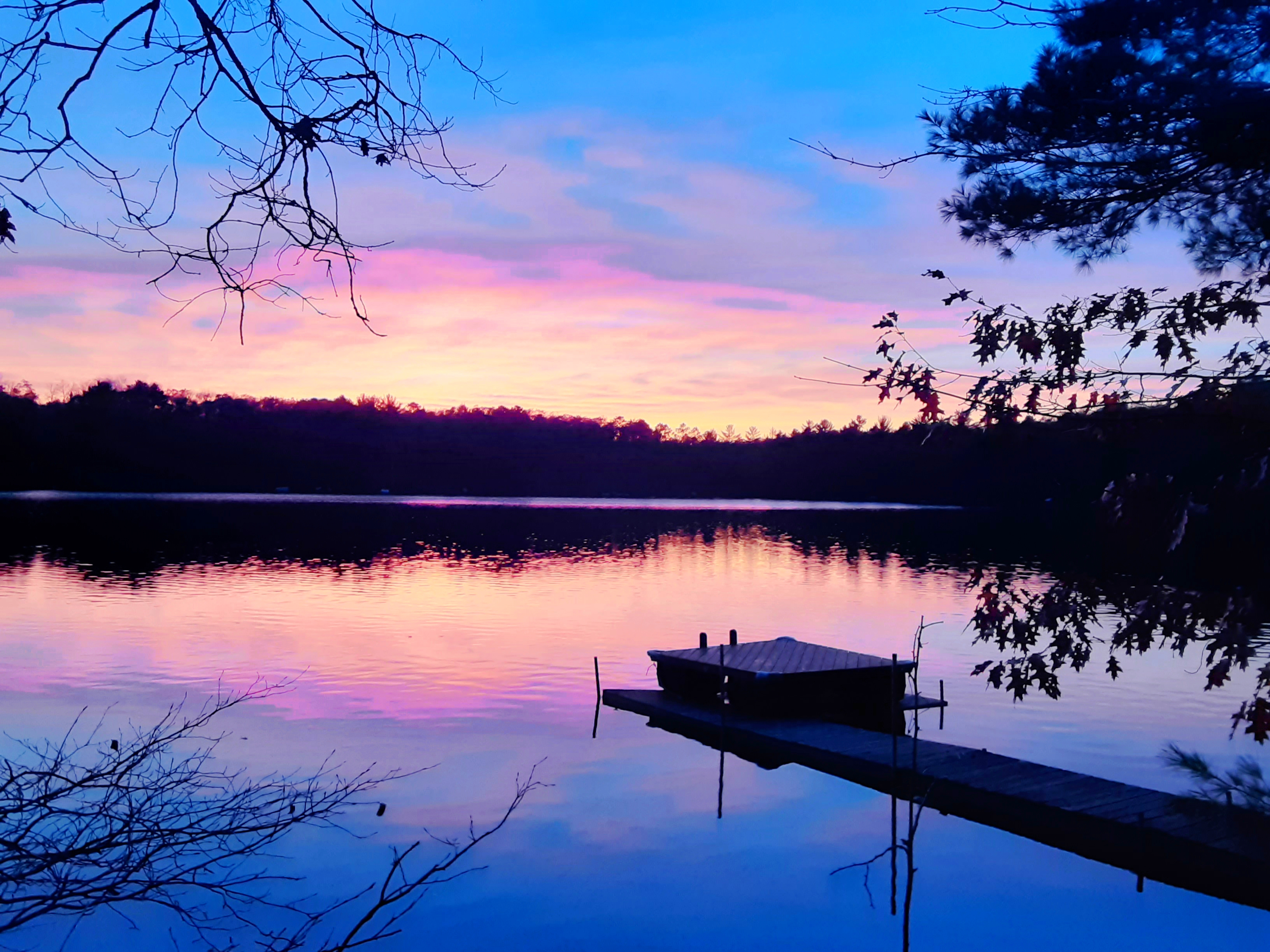
A sunset over Alma Lake

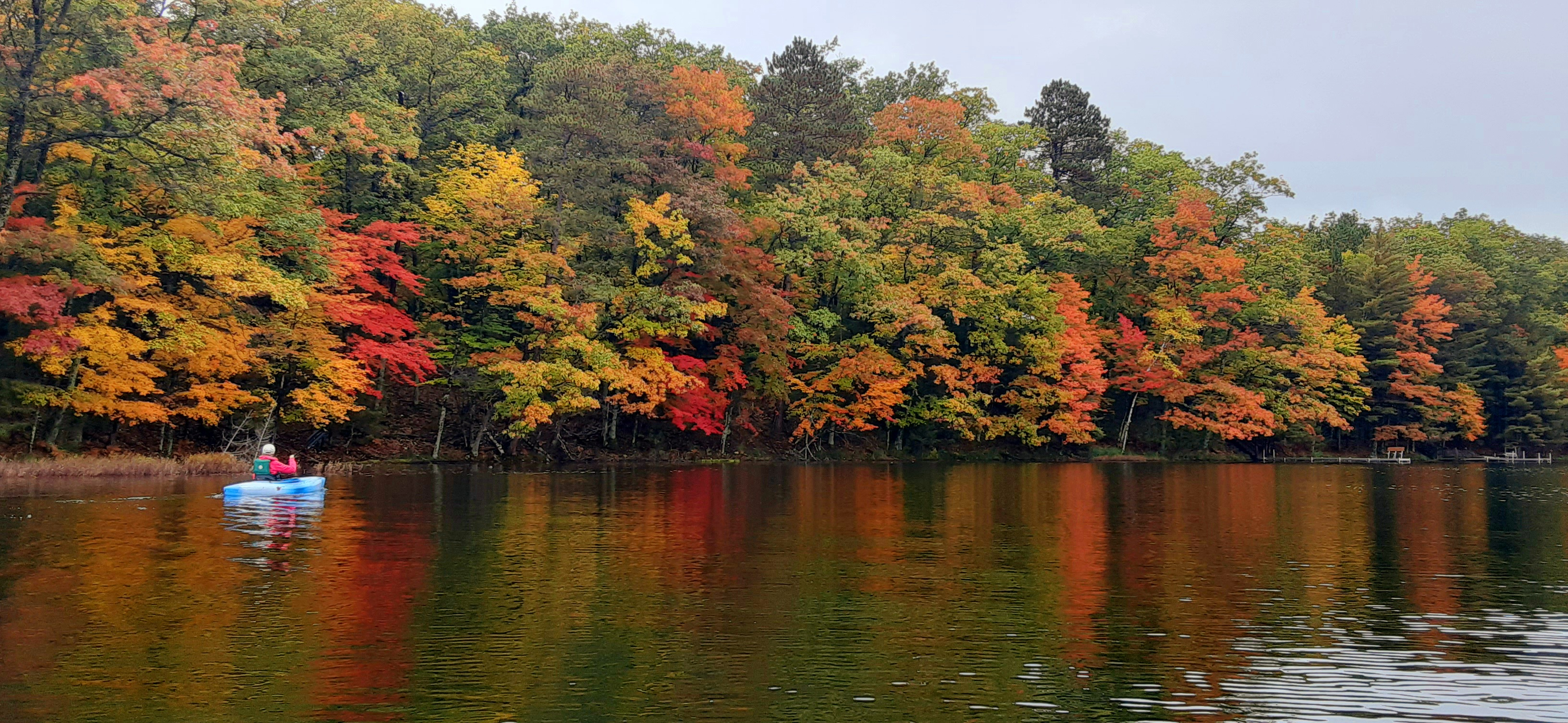
View of the Alma Lake shoreline during Fall 2019

Alma Lake's watershed is made up largely of forests. Home developments are the most significant development in the area, taking up only 2% of the 789,140 square meter watershed. Only 1% of the watershed is made up of wetlands.
