= Flambeau Lake =

Lake in the state of Wisconsin, United States

- Waaswaagani-zaaga'igan (Ojibwe)
- Location within Wisconsin Location within the United States
- Location: Vilas County, Wisconsin
- Coordinates: 45.9646001°N 89.9237414°W
- Type: Drainage Lake
- Surface area: 1,166 acres (472 ha)
- Average depth: 28 feet (8.5 m)
- Max. depth: 78 feet (24 m)
- Surface elevation: 1,581 feet (482 m)
- Islands: Strawberry Island (25.5 acre), Island number 2 (1.45 acre), Island number 3 (.13 acre)
- Settlements: Lac du Flambeau

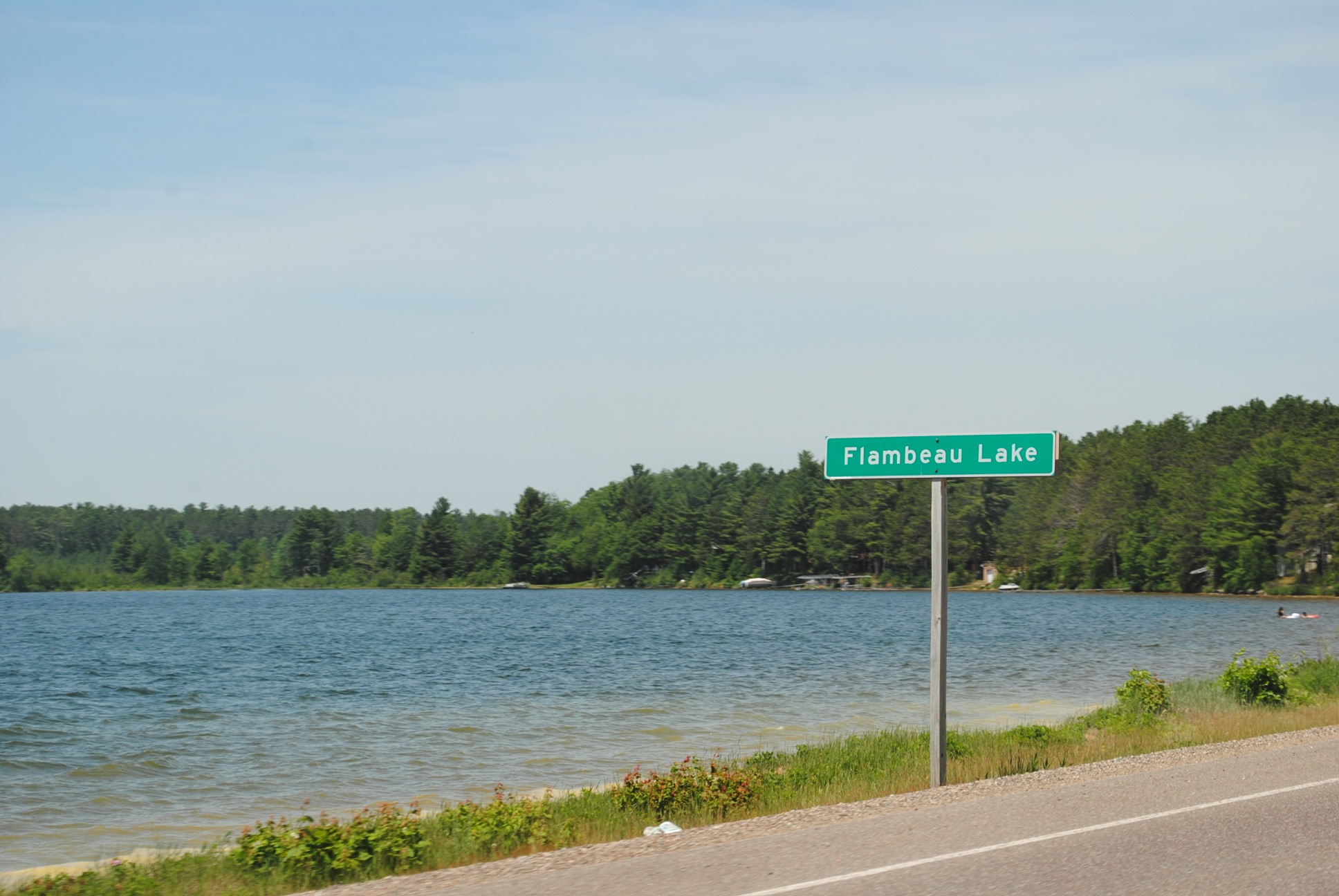
Flambeau Lake off Wisconsin Highway 47, around which the community is located.

Flambeau Lake (Ojibwe: Waaswaagani-zaaga'igan) is a 1,166 acre lake in Vilas County, Wisconsin, USA. The community of Lac du Flambeau completely surrounds the lake. Fish present in the lake are muskellunge, largemouth bass, smallmouth bass, northern pike and walleye. There is one boat ramp on the northeast shore, accessible from Highway 47. It has a maximum depth of 78 feet. Visitors have access to the lake from a public boat landing. Fish include Musky, Panfish, Largemouth Bass, Smallmouth Bass, Northern Pike and Walleye.

== See also ==
- List of lakes in Vilas County, Wisconsin
- List of lakes in Wisconsin
