= Lac du Flambeau, Wisconsin =

- Town
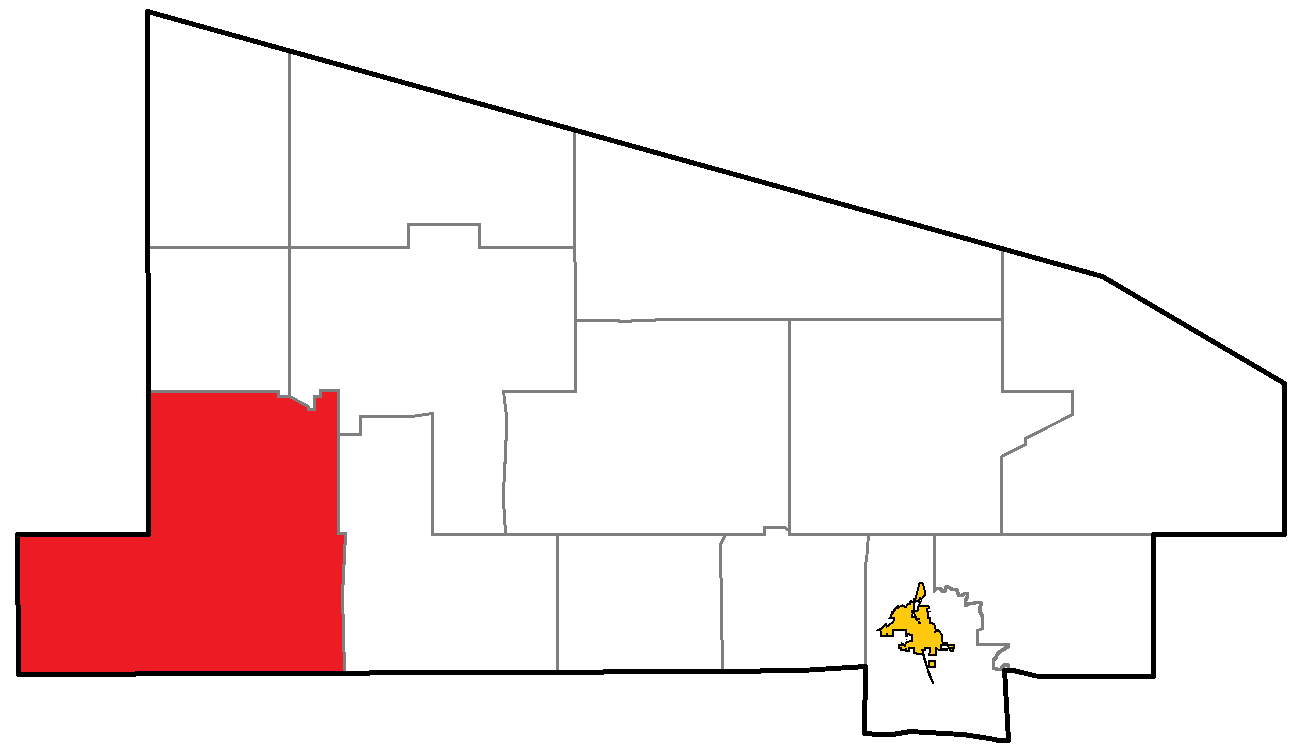
- Location of the Town of Lac du Flambeau, within Vilas County
- Coordinates: 45°57′24″N 89°52′11″W
- Country: United States
- State: Wisconsin
- County: Vilas

Area
  - Total: 127.7 sq mi (330.8 km^{2})
  - Land: 100.3 sq mi (259.8 km^{2})
  - Water: 27.4 sq mi (71.0 km^{2})
- Elevation: 1,601 ft (488 m)

Population (2020)
  - Total: 3,552
  - Density: 35.41/sq mi (13.67/km^{2})
- Time zone: UTC-6 (Central (CST))
  - Summer (DST): UTC-5 (CDT)
- Area codes: 715 & 534
- FIPS code: 55-40687
- GNIS feature ID: 1583497
- Website: https://www.tn.lacduflambeau.wi.gov/

The Town of Lac du Flambeau is located in Vilas County, Wisconsin, United States. The population was 3,552 at the 2020 census. The land base of the Lac du Flambeau Band of Lake Superior Chippewa is located within the town and also consists of a large portion of the town. The Lac du Flambeau census-designated place is located within the town. The unincorporated community of Marlands is also located in the town. Lac du Flambeau, situated around Flambeau Lake, is a year-round vacation destination.

== History ==
The Lac du Flambeau Band of Lake Superior Chippewa have lived in this area since 1745, when Chief Keeshkemun led the Band to the area. European-American fur traders first established themselves in Lac du Flambeau in 1792. The fur trade continued in the area until around 1835. In 1854, the Treaty of La Pointe established the Lac du Fleambeau reservation. Logging began on the reservation in 1885, and the town soon hosted the largest lumber yard in Wisconsin.

An Indian residential school, the Government Boarding School at Lac du Flambeau, was founded in 1895. At least six students died during their time at the school between 1895 and 1932.

== Demographics ==
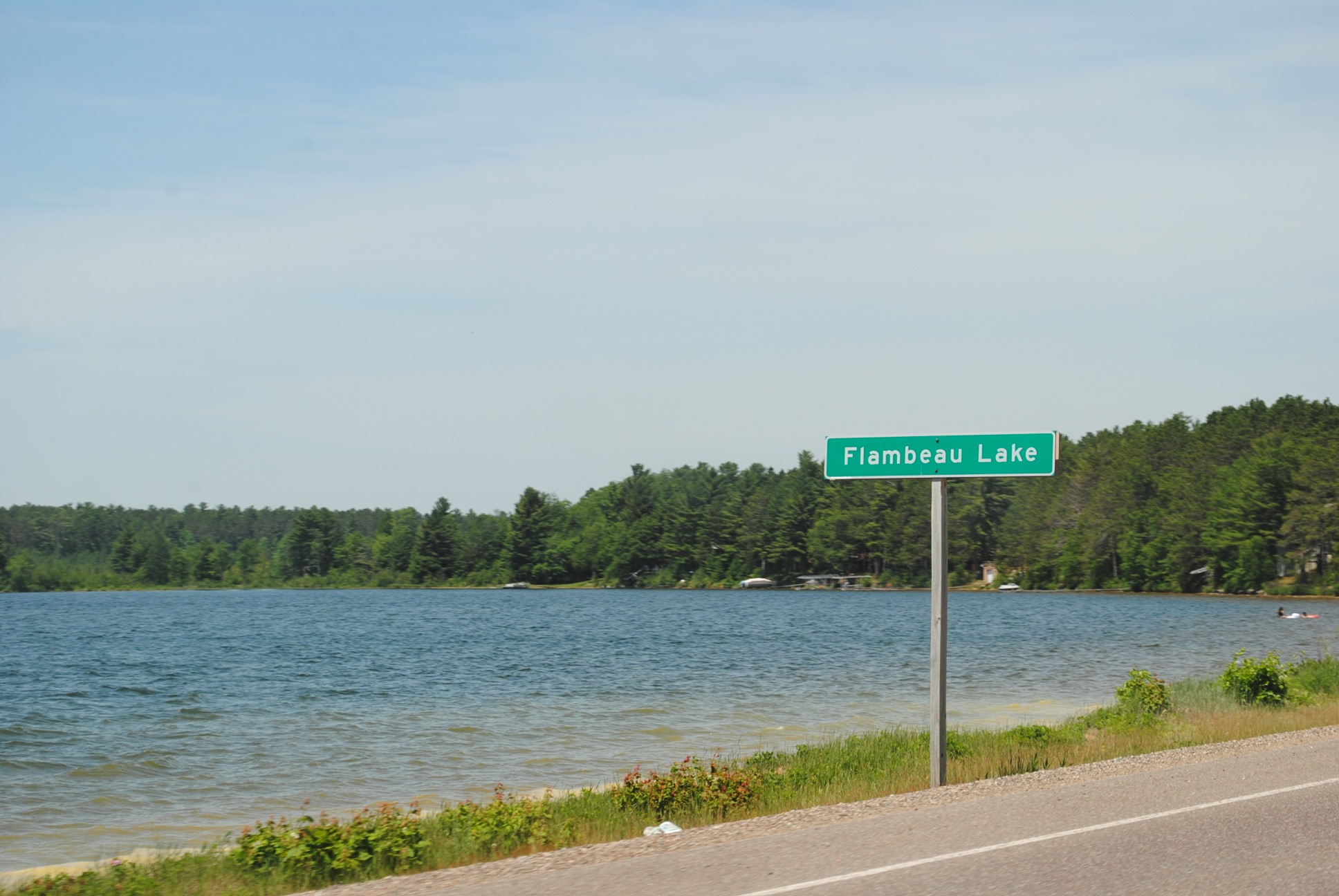
Flambeau Lake off Wisconsin Highway 47, around which the community is located.

At the 2000 census there were 3,004 people, 1,093 households, and 821 families in the town. The population density was 29.9 people per square mile (11.5 people/km^{2}). There were 2,981 housing units at an average density of 29.7 units per square mile (11.5 units/km^{2}). The racial makeup of the town was 39.55% White, 0.20% Black or African American, 59.39% Native American, 0.30% from other races, and 0.57% from two or more races. 1.60% of the population were Hispanic or Latino of any race. Of the 1,093 households 31.7% had children under the age of 18 living with them, 49.2% were married couples living together, 19.3% had a female householder with no husband present, and 24.8% were non-families. 20.1% of households were one person and 8.1% were one person aged 65 or older. The average household size was 2.72 and the average family size was 3.07.

The age distribution was 29.8% under the age of 18, 7.1% from 18 to 24, 23.0% from 25 to 44, 23.4% from 45 to 64, and 16.8% 65 or older. The median age was 37 years. For every 100 females, there were 99.1 males. For every 100 females age 18 and over, there were 90.6 males.

The median household income was $30,349 and the median family income was $33,036. Males had a median income of $27,589 versus $22,560 for females. The per capita income for the town was $15,176. About 12.1% of families and 15.7% of the population were below the poverty line, including 24.1% of those under age 18 and 5.0% of those age 65 or over.

== Economy ==
The Lac du Flambeau Band have developed the Lake of the Torches resort and casino. The Lac du Flambeau Band started the LDF Business Development Program.

== Media ==
WLDF, a tribal-owned commercial adult alternative radio station, is based out of Lac du Flambeau.

== Notable people ==
- Ellsworth K. Gaulke, businessman, educator, and politician
- William R. Yeschek, businessman and politician
- Susan Poupart; murdered in 1999 and the case remains unsolved
