= St. Germain, Wisconsin =

- Town
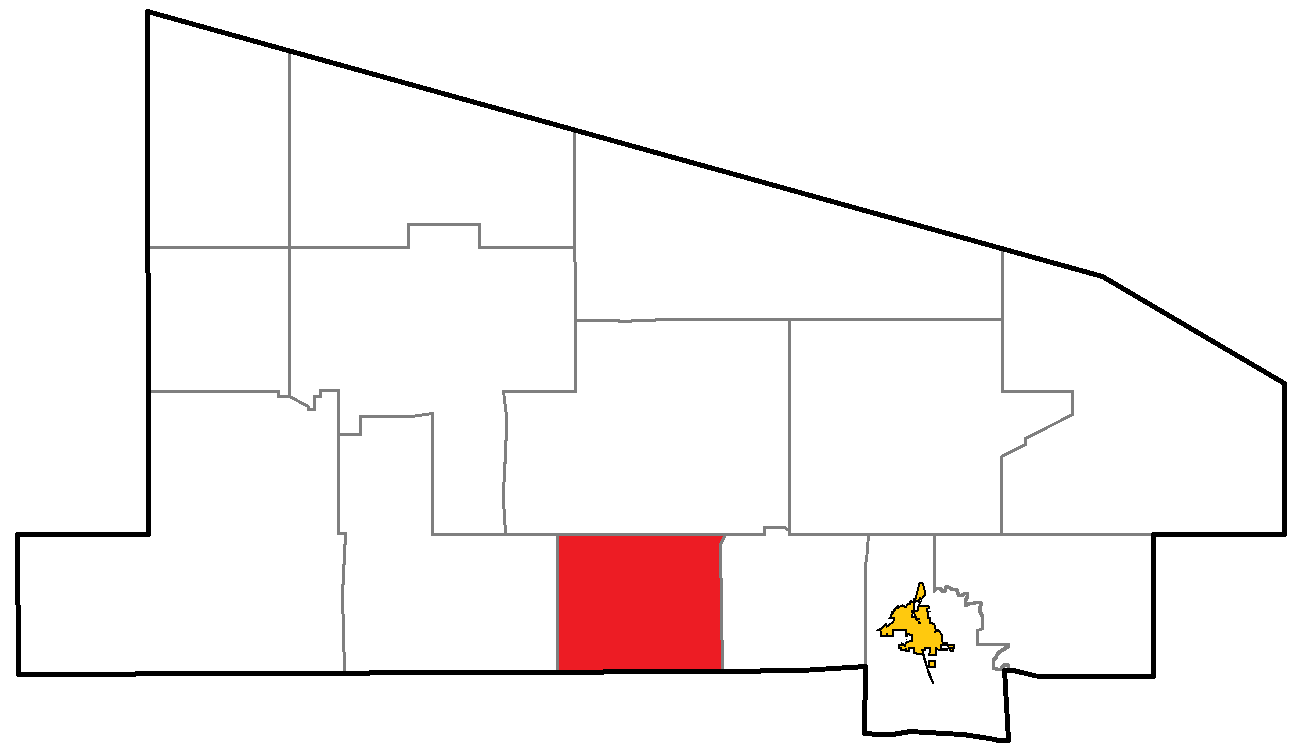
- Location of St. Germain, within Vilas County
- Coordinates: 45°55′45″N 89°29′13″W
- Country: United States
- State: Wisconsin
- County: Vilas
- Established: 1907

Government
  - Type: Board of supervisors
  - Chairman: John Vojta

Area
  - Total: 40.0 sq mi (103.7 km^{2})
  - Land: 34.0 sq mi (88.0 km^{2})
  - Water: 6.0 sq mi (15.6 km^{2})
- Elevation: 1,594 ft (486 m)

Population (2020)
  - Total: 2,083
  - Density: 61.3/sq mi (23.7/km^{2})
- Time zone: UTC-6 (Central (CST))
  - Summer (DST): UTC-5 (CDT)
- Postal code: 54558
- Area codes: 715 & 534
- FIPS code: 55-70725
- GNIS feature ID: 1584088
- Website: http://www.townofstgermain.org

St. Germain is a town in Vilas County, Wisconsin, United States. The population was 2,083 at the 2020 census. The unincorporated community of St. Germain is located in the town.

== Geography ==
According to the United States Census Bureau, the town has a total area of 40.0 square miles (104 km^{2}), of which 34.0 square miles (88 km^{2}) is land and 6.0 square miles (16 km^{2}) (15.09%) is water.

== Demographics ==
As of the census of 2000, there were 1,932 people, 887 households, and 623 families residing in the town. The population density was 56.8 people per square mile (21.9 people/km^{2}). There were 2,067 housing units at an average density of 60.8 units per square mile (23.5 units/km^{2}). The racial makeup of the town was 98.24% White, 0.21% African American, 0.26% Native American, 0.36% Asian, 0.26% from other races, and 0.67% from two or more races. Hispanic or Latino of any race were 0.98% of the population.

There were 887 households, out of which 20.9% had children under the age of 18 living with them, 63.7% were married couples living together, 4.5% had a female householder with no husband present, and 29.7% were non-families. 27.3% of all households were made up of individuals, and 14.9% had someone living alone who was 65 years of age or older. The average household size was 2.18 and the average family size was 2.60.

In the town, the population was spread out, with 18.4% under the age of 18, 3.7% from 18 to 24, 22.4% from 25 to 44, 30.5% from 45 to 64, and 25.0% who were 65 years of age or older. The median age was 50 years. For every 100 females, there were 98.4 males. For every 100 females age 18 and over, there were 96.8 males.

The median income for a household in the town was $32,969, and the median income for a family was $41,815. Males had a median income of $34,500 versus $21,417 for females. The per capita income for the town was $21,755. About 6.3% of families and 8.0% of the population were below the poverty line, including 12.0% of those under age 18 and 6.8% of those age 65 or over.

== Notable businesses ==
- Snowmobile Hall of Fame and Museum
- St Germain Chamber of Commerce

== Climate ==
The climate is described as Humid Continental by the Köppen Climate System, abbreviated as Dfb.

Climate data for St. Germain, Wisconsin, 1991–2020 normals, 1971-2020 extremes: 1,643 ft (501 m)
Month	Jan	Feb	Mar	Apr	May	Jun	Jul	Aug	Sep	Oct	Nov	Dec	Year
Record high °F (°C)	48 (9)	55 (13)	72 (22)	89 (32)	89 (32)	93 (34)	97 (36)	95 (35)	92 (33)	83 (28)	70 (21)	58 (14)	97 (36)
Mean maximum °F (°C)	38.3 (3.5)	44.8 (7.1)	57.6 (14.2)	74.7 (23.7)	81.3 (27.4)	85.2 (29.6)	86.3 (30.2)	85.2 (29.6)	81.4 (27.4)	72.6 (22.6)	56.3 (13.5)	40.2 (4.6)	87.0 (30.6)
Mean daily maximum °F (°C)	19.9 (−6.7)	24.6 (−4.1)	36.2 (2.3)	48.9 (9.4)	62.9 (17.2)	72.3 (22.4)	75.4 (24.1)	73.4 (23.0)	65.8 (18.8)	52.0 (11.1)	36.8 (2.7)	25.0 (−3.9)	49.4 (9.7)
Daily mean °F (°C)	10.2 (−12.1)	13.2 (−10.4)	24.7 (−4.1)	37.5 (3.1)	51.3 (10.7)	61.9 (16.6)	65.9 (18.8)	64.0 (17.8)	56.3 (13.5)	42.8 (6.0)	29.3 (−1.5)	17.1 (−8.3)	39.5 (4.2)
Mean daily minimum °F (°C)	0.5 (−17.5)	1.7 (−16.8)	13.1 (−10.5)	26.1 (−3.3)	39.6 (4.2)	51.4 (10.8)	56.3 (13.5)	54.6 (12.6)	46.7 (8.2)	33.7 (0.9)	21.7 (−5.7)	9.1 (−12.7)	29.5 (−1.4)
Mean minimum °F (°C)	−22.9 (−30.5)	−20.7 (−29.3)	−13.7 (−25.4)	10.6 (−11.9)	26.0 (−3.3)	37.0 (2.8)	44.4 (6.9)	42.8 (6.0)	31.5 (−0.3)	21.5 (−5.8)	3.9 (−15.6)	−15.5 (−26.4)	−26.8 (−32.7)
Record low °F (°C)	−40 (−40)	−43 (−42)	−25 (−32)	−8 (−22)	19 (−7)	32 (0)	35 (2)	35 (2)	24 (−4)	7 (−14)	−18 (−28)	−33 (−36)	−43 (−42)
Average precipitation inches (mm)	1.39 (35)	1.19 (30)	1.78 (45)	2.82 (72)	3.79 (96)	4.15 (105)	4.30 (109)	3.34 (85)	3.81 (97)	3.44 (87)	1.95 (50)	1.64 (42)	33.6 (853)
Average snowfall inches (cm)	15.20 (38.6)	14.60 (37.1)	11.70 (29.7)	8.20 (20.8)	0.10 (0.25)	0.00 (0.00)	0.00 (0.00)	0.00 (0.00)	0.00 (0.00)	1.80 (4.6)	8.60 (21.8)	13.50 (34.3)	73.7 (187.15)
Source 1: NOAA
Source 2: XMACIS (temp records & 1981-2010 monthly max/mins)
