= Mud Lake (Wisconsin) =

Lake in the state of Wisconsin, United States

There are 116 lakes named Mud Lake in the U.S. state of Wisconsin. Mud Lake is the most common lake name in the state. Because of the way GNIS is organized some of the names listed below may be for the same lake.

- Mud Lake, Ashland County, Wisconsin. 46°11′58″N 90°53′00″W
- Mud Lake, Ashland County, Wisconsin. 46°16′30″N 90°52′59″W
- Mud Lake, Barron County, Wisconsin. 45°17′11″N 91°41′27″W
- Mud Lake, Barron County, Wisconsin. 45°21′42″N 91°39′10″W
- Mud Lake, Barron County, Wisconsin. 45°23′44″N 92°07′17″W
- Mud Lake, Barron County, Wisconsin. 45°30′41″N 92°06′04″W
- Mud Lake, Barron County, Wisconsin. 45°33′59″N 91°50′27″W
- Mud Lake, Barron County, Wisconsin. 45°34′26″N 91°54′33″W
- Sugar Bush Lake, also known as Mud Lake, Bayfield County, Wisconsin. 46°15′22″N 91°12′22″W
- Mud Lake, Bayfield County, Wisconsin. 46°26′01″N 91°15′52″W
- Mud Lake, Bayfield County, Wisconsin. 46°33′03″N 91°26′30″W
- Mud Lake, Burnett County, Wisconsin. 45°55′11″N 92°19′10″W
- Mud Lake, Burnett County, Wisconsin. 45°59′52″N 92°13′16″W
- Mud Lake, Chippewa County, Wisconsin. 45°03′45″N 91°17′41″W
- Mud Lake, Chippewa County, Wisconsin. 45°11′04″N 91°22′48″W
- Mud Lake, Chippewa County, Wisconsin. 45°13′29″N 91°16′06″W
- Mud Lake, Columbia County, Wisconsin. 43°24′46″N 89°17′34″W
- Mud Lake, Columbia County, Wisconsin. 43°33′01″N 89°27′47″W
- Mud Lake, Dane County, Wisconsin. 42°59′54″N 89°17′21″W
- Mud Lake, Dane County, Wisconsin. 43°06′22″N 89°02′46″W
- Mud Lake, Dane County, Wisconsin. 43°17′23″N 89°39′50″W
- Mud Lake, Dodge County, Wisconsin. 43°13′55″N 88°52′34″W
- Mud Lake, Door County, Wisconsin. 44°51′57″N 87°15′37″W
- Arbter Lake, also known as Mud Lake, Door County, Wisconsin. 44°53′38″N 87°13′38″W
- Mud Lake, Door County, Wisconsin. 45°07′08″N 87°05′38″W
- Mud Lake, Door County, Wisconsin. 45°11′28″N 87°21′52″W
- Mud Lake, Douglas County, Wisconsin. 46°18′48″N 91°33′58″W
- Mud Lake, Douglas County, Wisconsin. 46°27′41″N 92°05′16″W
- Mud Lake, Florence County, Wisconsin. 45°43′00″N 88°07′00″W
- Mud Lake, Florence County, Wisconsin. 45°43′41″N 88°36′28″W
- Mud Lake, Florence County, Wisconsin. 45°44′11″N 88°26′58″W
- Hord Lake, also known as Mud Lake, Florence County, Wisconsin. 45°45′25″N 88°14′23″W
- Mud Lake, Florence County, Wisconsin. 45°52′31″N 88°27′31″W
- Mud Lake, Florence County, Wisconsin. 45°53′55″N 88°32′18″W
- Sevenmile Lake, also known as Mud Lake, Florence County, Wisconsin. 45°55′04″N 88°22′20″W
- Mud Lake, Florence County, Wisconsin. 45°56′14″N 88°14′46″W
- Mud Lake, Fond du Lac County, Wisconsin. 43°39′26″N 88°13′23″W
- Mud Lake, Forest County, Wisconsin. 45°24′36″N 88°47′19″W
- Mud Lake, Forest County, Wisconsin. 45°24′37″N 88°45′35″W
- Zarling Lake, also known as Mud Lake, Forest County, Wisconsin. 45°26′14″N 88°44′16″W
- Walsh Lake, also known as Mud Lake, Forest County, Wisconsin. 45°27′04″N 88°52′17″W
- Mud Lake Number One, also known as Mud Lake, Forest County, Wisconsin. 45°29′24″N 88°40′18″W
- Little Birch Lake, also known as Mud Lake, Forest County, Wisconsin. 45°34′00″N 88°39′15″W
- Atkins Lake, also known as Mud Lake, Forest County, Wisconsin. 45°39′21″N 89°02′46″W
- Forest Lake, also known as Mud Lake, Forest County, Wisconsin. 45°43′09″N 88°26′10″W
- Mainline Lake, also known as Mud Lake, Forest County, Wisconsin. 45°54′39″N 88°44′30″W
- Mud Lake, Forest County, Wisconsin. 45°56′52″N 88°41′58″W
- Mud Lake, Iron County, Wisconsin. 46°06′35″N 89°57′30″W
- Mud Lake, Iron County, Wisconsin. 46°15′41″N 90°14′41″W
- Mud Lake, Jefferson County, Wisconsin. 42°54′08″N 88°54′03″W
- Mud Lake, Jefferson County, Wisconsin. 43°02′47″N 88°55′18″W
- Peat Lake, also known as Mud Lake, Kenosha County, Wisconsin. 42°29′53″N 88°09′32″W
- Mud Lake, Kenosha County, Wisconsin. 42°30′05″N 88°02′13″W
- Friendship Lake, also known as Mud Lake, Kenosha County, Wisconsin. 42°38′34″N 88°05′10″W
- Van Loon Lake, also known as Mud Lake, La Crosse County, Wisconsin. 44°02′16″N 91°18′54″W
- Mud Lake, Langlade County, Wisconsin. 45°03′22″N 89°04′33″W
- Mud Lake, Langlade County, Wisconsin. 45°07′23″N 88°51′30″W
- Mud Lake, Langlade County, Wisconsin. 45°09′01″N 88°44′28″W
- Setting Lake, also known as Mud Lake, Langlade County, Wisconsin. 45°15′54″N 88°41′28″W
- Tekakwitha Lake, also known as Mud Lake, Langlade County, Wisconsin. 45°23′07″N 88°56′38″W
- Mud Lake, Lincoln County, Wisconsin. 45°17′23″N 89°39′47″W
- Mud Lake, Lincoln County, Wisconsin. 45°31′00″N 89°33′29″W
- Mud Lake, Manitowoc County, Wisconsin. 43°57′30″N 87°59′54″W
- Mud Lake, Marathon County, Wisconsin. 44°55′08″N 89°17′27″W
- Giese Lake, also known as Mud Lake, Marinette County, Wisconsin. 45°08′15″N 88°11′09″W
- Mud Lake, Marinette County, Wisconsin. 45°08′15″N 88°11′08″W
- Mud Lake, Marinette County, Wisconsin. 45°11′58″N 88°10′46″W
- Mud Lake, Marinette County, Wisconsin. 45°19′00″N 87°48′53″W
- Mud Lake, Marinette County, Wisconsin. 45°21′31″N 87°53′59″W
- D'Amour Lake, also known as Mud Lake, Marinette County, Wisconsin. 45°35′29″N 88°18′14″W
- Mud Lake, Marinette County, Wisconsin. 45°36′10″N 88°07′48″W
- Clark Lake, also known as Mud Lake, Marinette County, Wisconsin. 45°38′06″N 88°21′16″W
- Mud Lake, Marquette County, Wisconsin. 43°41′38″N 89°34′53″W
- Mud Lake, Marquette County, Wisconsin. 43°45′31″N 89°24′40″W
- Mud Lake, Marquette County, Wisconsin. 43°48′41″N 89°22′52″W
- Mud Lake, Marquette County, Wisconsin. 43°49′25″N 89°17′44″W
- Mud Lake, Marquette County, Wisconsin. 43°52′06″N 89°35′10″W
- Mud Lake, Marquette County, Wisconsin. 43°52′55″N 89°20′29″W
- Mud Lake, Milwaukee County, Wisconsin. 42°55′35″N 87°57′43″W
- Mud Lake, Monroe County, Wisconsin. 44°07′40″N 90°57′05″W
- Mud Lake, Oconto County, Wisconsin. 45°14′32″N 88°34′04″W
- Sunset Lake, also known as Mud Lake, Oneida County, Wisconsin. 45°39′39″N 89°17′21″W
- Mud Lake, Oneida County, Wisconsin. 45°40′33″N 89°11′14″W
- Mud Lake, Oneida County, Wisconsin. 45°42′22″N 89°25′30″W
- Mud Lake, Oneida County, Wisconsin. 45°42′23″N 89°19′50″W
- Haven Lake, also known as Mud Lake, Oneida County, Wisconsin. 45°46′16″N 89°21′18″W
- Mud Lake, Oneida County, Wisconsin. 45°46′26″N 89°08′03″W
- Mud Lake, Oneida County, Wisconsin. 45°47′54″N 89°39′14″W
- Mid Lake, also known as Mud Lake, Oneida County, Wisconsin. 45°51′28″N 89°39′58″W
- Mud Lake, Ozaukee County, Wisconsin. 43°22′28″N 88°01′16″W
- Long Lake, also known as Mud Lake, Ozaukee County, Wisconsin. 43°23′21″N 88°00′02″W
- Mud Lake, Pierce County, Wisconsin. 44°34′45″N 92°31′56″W
- Mud Lake, Polk County, Wisconsin. 45°17′36″N 92°33′22″W
- Mud Lake, Polk County, Wisconsin. 45°19′07″N 92°11′39″W
- Mud Lake, Polk County, Wisconsin. 45°19′07″N 92°26′17″W
- Mud Lake, Polk County, Wisconsin. 45°23′10″N 92°28′31″W
- Mud Lake, Polk County, Wisconsin. 45°25′29″N 92°23′26″W
- Mud Lake, Polk County, Wisconsin. 45°25′44″N 92°13′38″W
- Mud Lake, Polk County, Wisconsin. 45°27′44″N 92°09′58″W
- Mud Lake, Polk County, Wisconsin. 45°31′56″N 92°10′54″W
- Mud Lake, Polk County, Wisconsin. 45°35′45″N 92°10′42″W
- Mud Lake, Polk County, Wisconsin. 45°36′30″N 92°38′57″W
- Mud Lake, Portage County, Wisconsin. 44°25′31″N 89°13′32″W
- Penny Lake, also known as Mud Lake, Portage County, Wisconsin. 44°40′11″N 89°16′14″W
- Mud Lake, Portage County, Wisconsin. 44°40′29″N 89°16′57″W
- Mud Lake, Price County, Wisconsin. 45°45′01″N 90°39′45″W
- Mud Lake, Price County, Wisconsin. 45°48′30″N 90°08′03″W
- LeClaire Lake, also known as Mud Lake, Price County, Wisconsin. 45°49′38″N 90°37′11″W
- Mud Lake, Price County, Wisconsin. 45°56′38″N 90°31′15″W
- Mud Lake, Price County, Wisconsin. 45°57′11″N 90°35′21″W
- Mud Lake, Price County, Wisconsin. 45°58′09″N 90°38′09″W
- Fireside Lakes, also known as Mud Lake, Rusk County, Wisconsin. 45°19′08″N 91°19′57″W
- Mud Lake, Sawyer County, Wisconsin. 45°46′26″N 91°30′03″W
- Mud Lake, Sawyer County, Wisconsin. 45°50′25″N 91°28′44″W
- Mud Lake, Sawyer County, Wisconsin. 45°52′04″N 91°00′20″W
- Mud Lake, Sawyer County, Wisconsin. 45°57′26″N 91°31′17″W
- Mud Lake, Sawyer County, Wisconsin. 45°58′25″N 90°56′41″W
- Mud Lake, Sawyer County, Wisconsin. 45°59′48″N 91°14′56″W
- Fawn Lake, also known as Mud Lake, Sawyer County, Wisconsin. 46°06′50″N 91°13′11″W
- Mud Lake, Shawano County, Wisconsin. 44°47′58″N 88°26′14″W
- Washington Lake, also known as Mud Lake, Shawano County, Wisconsin. 44°49′37″N 88°29′30″W
- Mud Lake, Shawano County, Wisconsin. 44°49′47″N 88°17′58″W
- Mud Lake, Shawano County, Wisconsin. 44°55′51″N 88°45′36″W
- Mud Lake, Shawano County, Wisconsin. 44°56′40″N 89°13′09″W
- Mud Lake, Taylor County, Wisconsin. 45°03′11″N 90°51′56″W
- Mud Lake, Taylor County, Wisconsin. 45°06′11″N 90°41′29″W
- Mud Lake, Taylor County, Wisconsin. 45°07′21″N 90°38′19″W
- Mud Lake, Taylor County, Wisconsin. 45°11′26″N 90°27′06″W
- Mud Lake, Taylor County, Wisconsin. 45°12′28″N 90°31′47″W
- Mud Lake, Taylor County, Wisconsin. 45°12′33″N 90°34′44″W
- Mud Lake, Taylor County, Wisconsin. 45°16′00″N 90°20′31″W
- Mud Lake, Taylor County, Wisconsin. 45°20′22″N 90°06′40″W
- Mud Lake, Vilas County, Wisconsin. 45°56′43″N 89°26′18″W
- Frost Lake, also known as Mud Lake, Vilas County, Wisconsin. 45°57′29″N 89°19′04″W
- Mud Lake, Vilas County, Wisconsin. 45°57′47″N 89°53′12″W
- Mud Lake, Vilas County, Wisconsin. 45°59′02″N 89°20′33″W
- Fawn Lake, also known as Mud Lake, Vilas County, Wisconsin. 46°08′08″N 89°49′27″W
- Mud Lake, Vilas County, Wisconsin. 46°10′48″N 89°36′28″W
- Averill Lake, also known as Mud Lake, Vilas County, Wisconsin. 46°12′18″N 89°45′48″W
- Swan Lake, also known as Mud Lake, Walworth County, Wisconsin. 42°48′17″N 88°25′11″W
- Mud Lake, Washburn County, Wisconsin. 45°44′30″N 91°39′31″W
- Mud Lake, Washburn County, Wisconsin. 45°56′24″N 91°37′16″W
- Mud Lake, Washburn County, Wisconsin. 45°57′07″N 91°55′42″W
- Mud Lake, Washburn County, Wisconsin. 46°08′07″N 92°01′43″W
- Mud Lake, Washington County, Wisconsin. 43°13′22″N 88°11′10″W
- Mud Lake, Washington County, Wisconsin. 43°19′06″N 88°17′06″W
- Grass Lake, also known as Mud Lake, Waukesha County, Wisconsin. 43°06′46″N 88°24′54″W
- Mud Lake, Waupaca County, Wisconsin. 44°16′48″N 89°10′11″W
- Manomin Lake, also known as Mud Lake, Waupaca County, Wisconsin. 44°19′38″N 89°11′23″W
- Mud Lake, Waupaca County, Wisconsin. 44°22′14″N 89°10′44″W
- Rich Lake, also known as Mud Lake, Waupaca County, Wisconsin. 44°27′10″N 89°00′25″W
- Mud Lake, Waupaca County, Wisconsin. 44°35′10″N 88°52′08″W
- Mud Lake, Waupaca County, Wisconsin. 44°38′14″N 89°05′52″W
- Lake Virginia, also known as Mud Lake, Waushara County, Wisconsin. 44°04′19″N 89°26′52″W
- Mud Lake, Waushara County, Wisconsin. 44°06′28″N 89°20′07″W
- Mud Lake, Waushara County, Wisconsin. 44°11′39″N 89°24′28″W

== See also ==
- List of lakes in Wisconsin
- Mud Lake (disambiguation)
