= Lac du Flambeau (CDP), Wisconsin =

Census-designated place in Wisconsin, United States

Lac du Flambeau, Wisconsin
- unincorporated community census-designated place
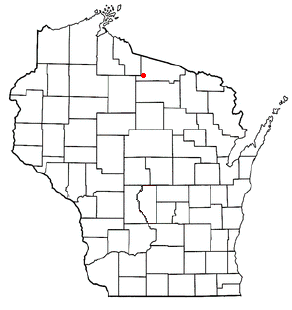
- Location of Lac du Flambeau, Wisconsin
- Coordinates: 45°58′14″N 89°54′1″W
- Country: United States
- State: Wisconsin
- County: Vilas

Area
  - Total: 7.7 sq mi (20.0 km^{2})
  - Land: 5.0 sq mi (13.0 km^{2})
  - Water: 2.7 sq mi (7.0 km^{2})

Population (2020)
  - Total: 1,845
  - Density: 368/sq mi (142/km^{2})
- Time zone: UTC-6 (Central (CST))
  - Summer (DST): UTC-5 (CDT)
- Area codes: 715 & 534

Lac du Flambeau is an unincorporated community in the town of Lac du Flambeau in Vilas County, Wisconsin, United States. For statistical purposes, the United States Census Bureau has defined that community as a census-designated place (CDP). The population was 1,845 at the 2020 census. Lac du Flambeau is the major community for the Lac du Flambeau Band of Lake Superior Chippewa tribe.

== Geography ==
According to the United States Census Bureau, the CDP has a total area of 7.7 square miles (20.0 km^{2}), of which 5.0 square miles (13.0 km^{2}) is land and 2.7 square miles (7.0 km^{2}) (35.01%) is water.

The community completely surrounds the 1,166 acres (472 ha) Flambeau Lake.

== Demographics ==
As of the census of 2000, there were 1,646 people, 524 households, and 410 families residing in the CDP. The population density was 327.5 people per square mile (126.3/km^{2}). There were 771 housing units at an average density of 153.4/sq mi (59.2/km^{2}). The racial makeup of the CDP was 12.33% White, 0.30% Black or African American, 86.57% Native American, 0.30% from other races, and 0.49% from two or more races. Hispanic or Latino of any race were 2.13% of the population.

There were 524 households, out of which 46.4% had children under the age of 18 living with them, 35.7% were married couples living together, 31.5% had a female householder with no husband present, and 21.6% were non-families. 16.4% of all households were made up of individuals, and 4.0% had someone living alone who was 65 years of age or older. The average household size was 3.14 and the average family size was 3.43.

In the CDP, the population was spread out, with 38.7% under the age of 18, 9.4% from 18 to 24, 27.3% from 25 to 44, 16.4% from 45 to 64, and 8.2% who were 65 years of age or older. The median age was 26 years. For every 100 females, there were 100.5 males. For every 100 females age 18 and over, there were 90.0 males.

The median income for a household in the CDP was $27,381, and the median income for a family was $28,350. Males had a median income of $24,750 versus $22,240 for females. The per capita income for the CDP was $11,496. About 18.9% of families and 21.6% of the population were below the poverty line, including 26.8% of those under age 18 and 3.1% of those age 65 or over.
