= Rantz, Wisconsin =

- Unincorporated community
- Location within Wisconsin Location within the United States
- Coordinates: 45°49′54″N 89°43′47″W
- Country: United States
- State: Wisconsin
- County: Oneida
- Elevation: 1,621 ft (494 m)
- Time zone: UTC-6 (Central (CST))
  - Summer (DST): UTC-5 (CDT)
- Area codes: 715 & 534
- GNIS feature ID: 1572080

Rantz is an unincorporated community located in the town of Minocqua, Oneida County, Wisconsin, United States. Rantz is located along the Bearskin State Trail, 3 miles (4.8 km) south of the community of Minocqua and 20.5 miles (33.0 km) northwest of Rhinelander.
