= Little Rock Lake =

Little Rock Lake can refer to:

- Little Rock Lake (Benton County, Minnesota)
- Little Rock Lake (Vilas County, Wisconsin)
