= KBDJ =

KBDJ may refer to:

- Boulder Junction Airport (ICAO code KBDJ)
- KBDJ-LP, a low-power radio station (97.1 FM) licensed to serve Waterloo, Iowa, United States
