= Black Tern Bog State Natural Area =

State Natural Area in Wisconsin

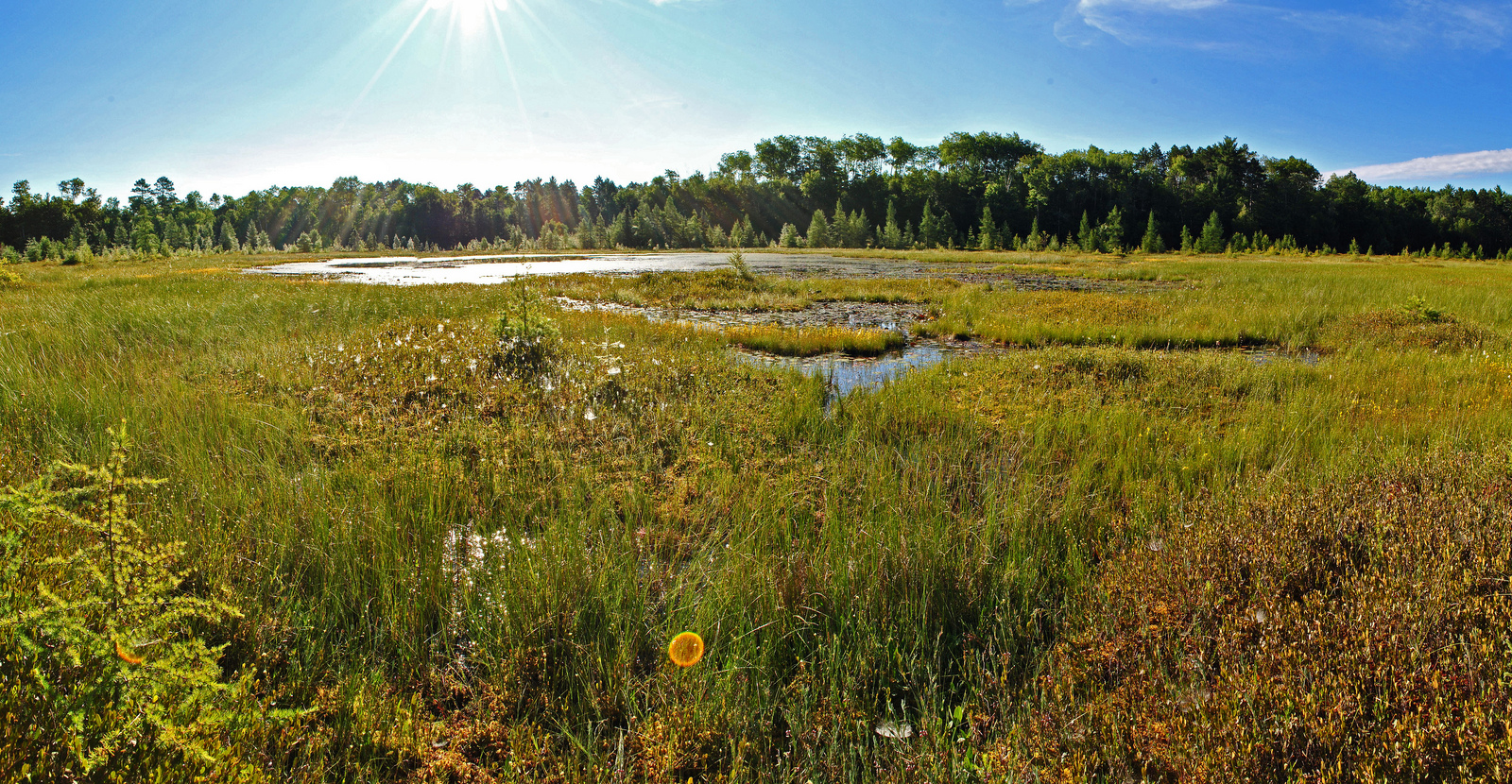

- Location within Wisconsin Location within the United States
- Location: Vilas County, Wisconsin
- Coordinates: 45°58′1.25″N 89°41′53.11″W
- Area: 20 acres (8.1 ha)
- Established: 1967
- Owner: Wisconsin Department of Natural Resources
- Website: Official website
- Wisconsin State Natural Areas

Black Tern Bog State Natural Area is a Wisconsin Department of Natural Resources-designated State Natural Area featuring 20 acres (8 ha) of quaking sphagnum bog surrounding two small seepage lakes situated in a pitted outwash plain. The bog is rich in plant species, such as sundews, pitcher plant, bogbean, and bog rosemary, as well as three species of bog orchids: swamp pink, grass pink, and rose pogonia. The state-endangered bog rush (Juncus stygius) also grows here. Birds known to nest here include black tern, American bittern, killdeer, and mallards.

== Location and access ==
Black Tern Bog is located in southwest Vilas County, approximately 3.5 miles (5.6 km) northwest of Arbor Vitae. Access is via an unnamed dirt road off US Highway 51, north of the bog. The road wraps around the northern and eastern portions of the bog. It is also possible to park on the shoulder of US Highway 51, which passes along the western edge of the bog.

== Gallery ==
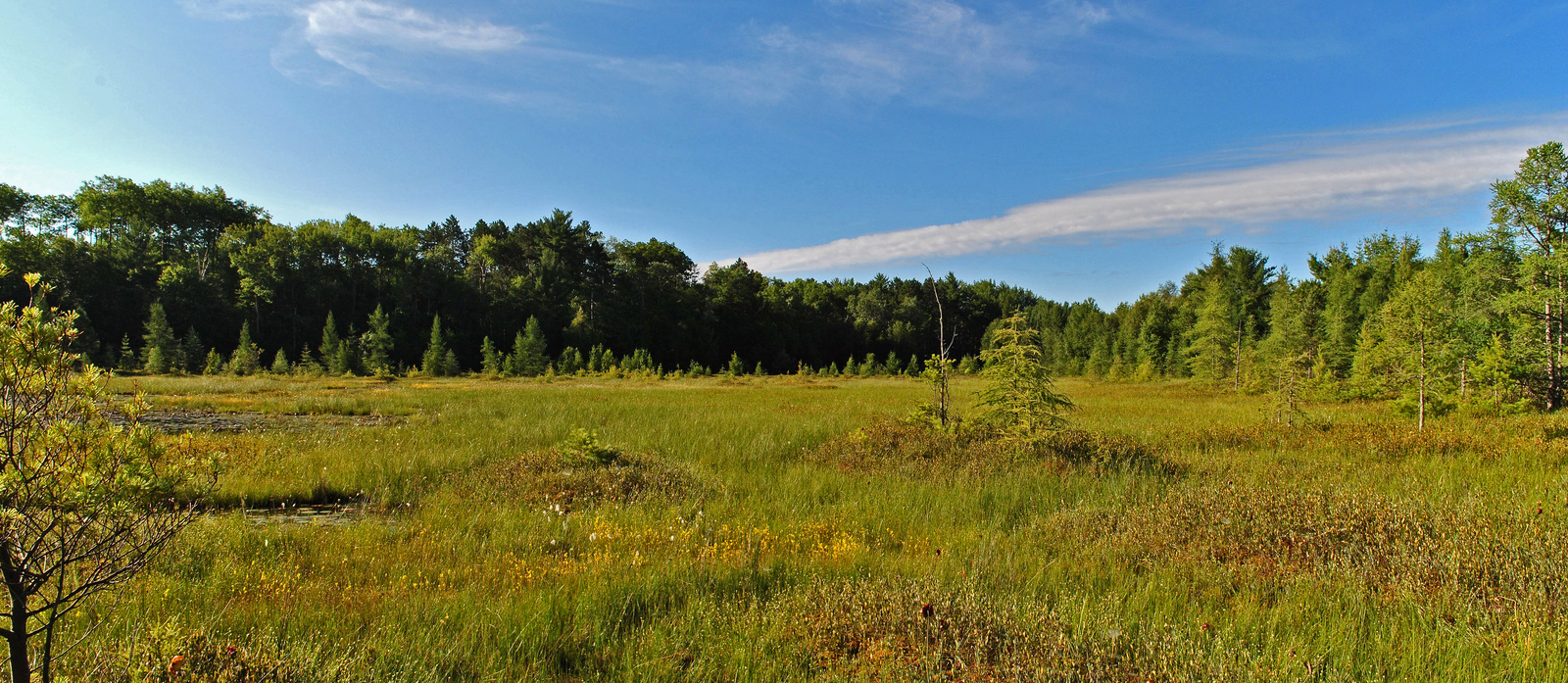
The south end of the bog

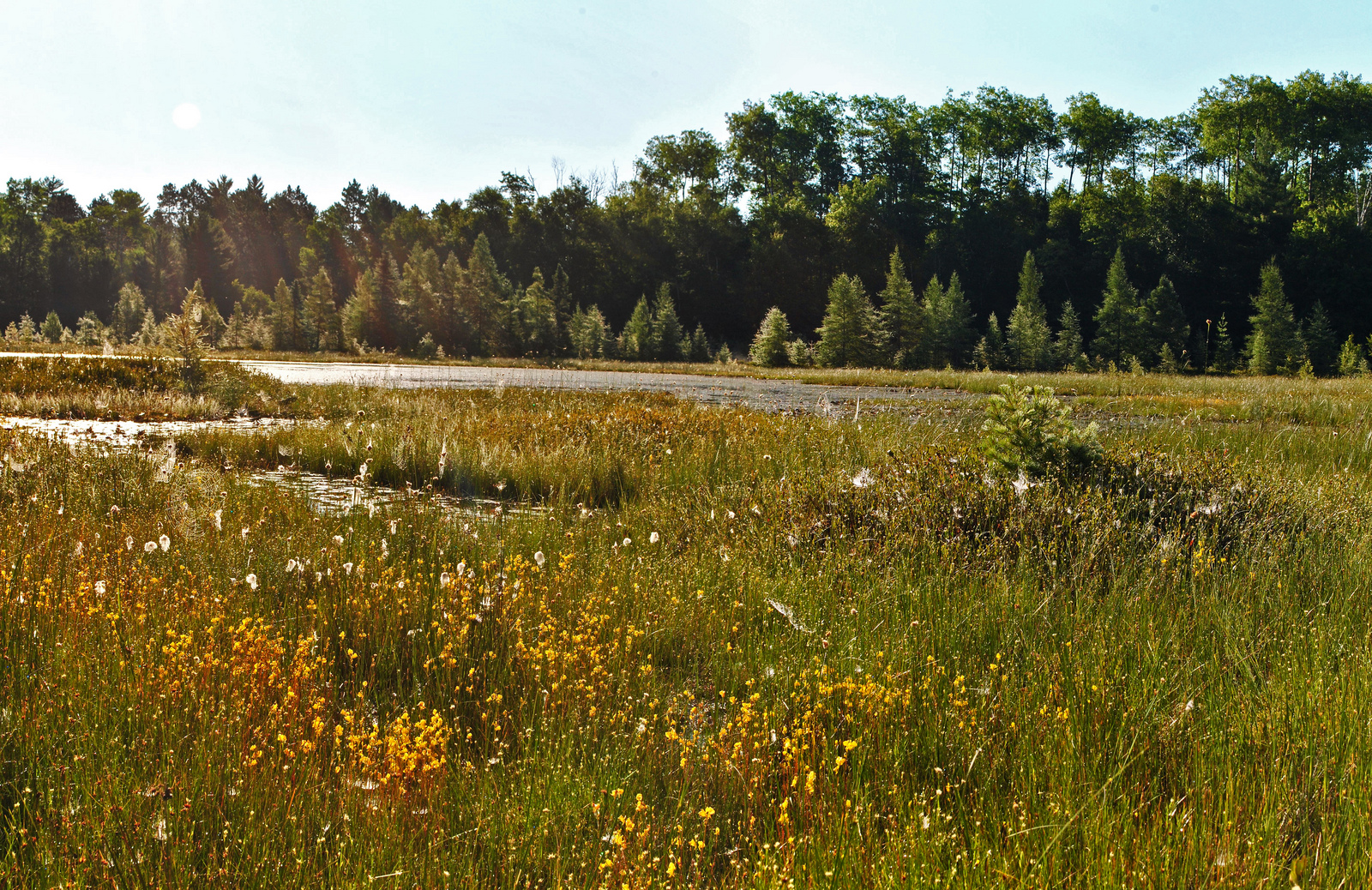
Looking east, across the central portion of the bog

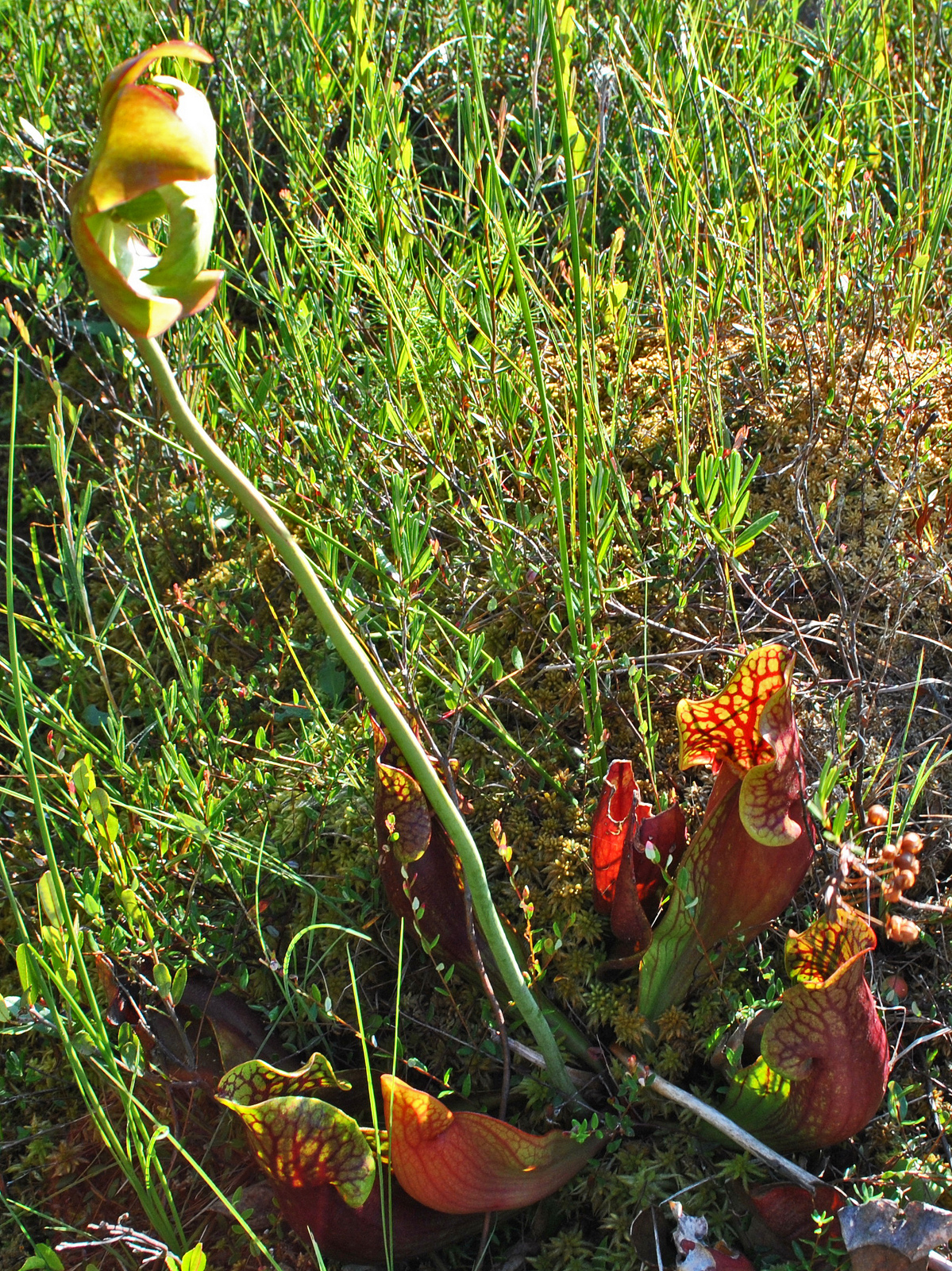
The carnivorous pitcher plant (Sarracenia purpurea) growing in Black Tern Bog
