= Boulder Junction, Wisconsin =

- Town
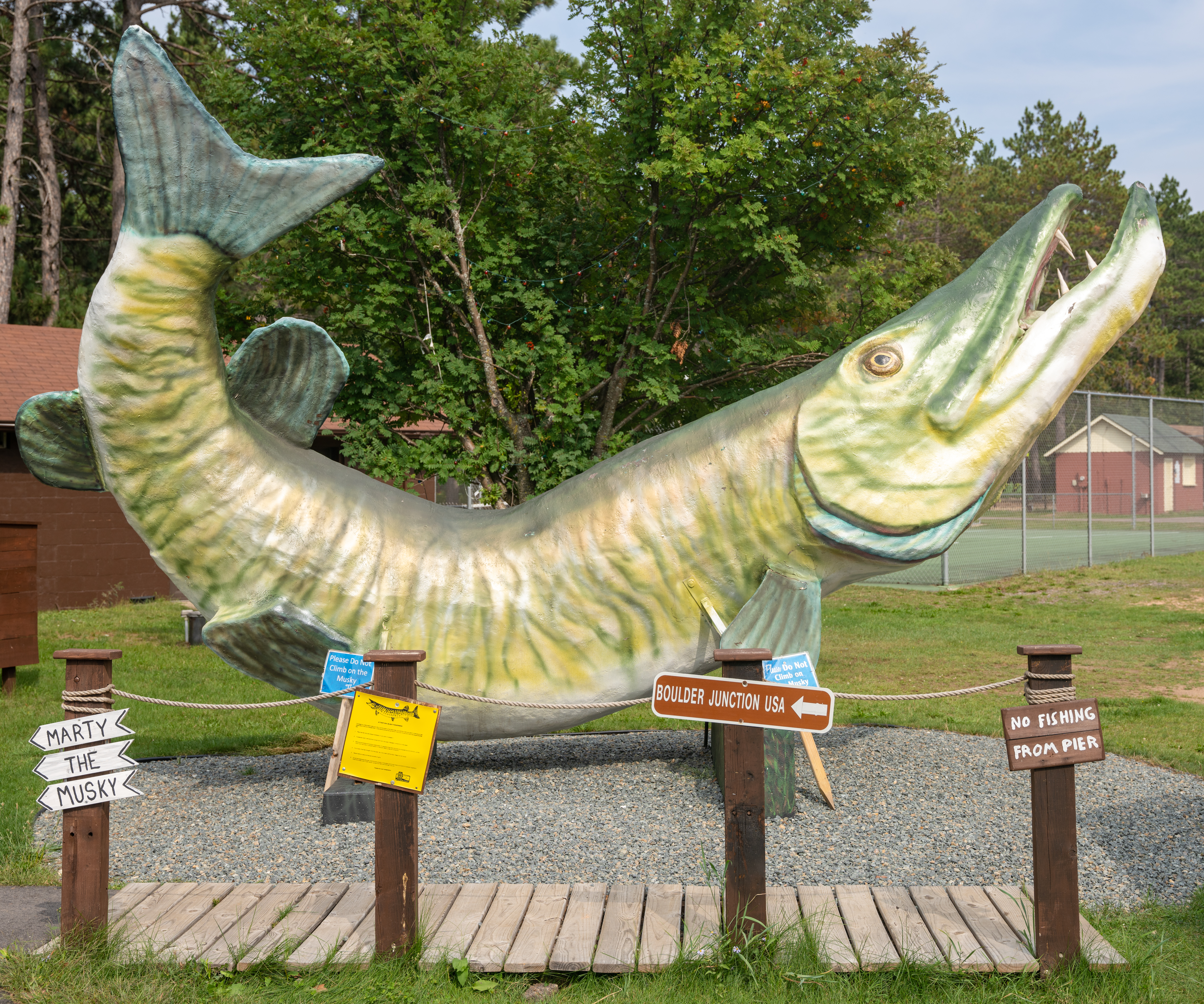
- Statue of "Marty the Musky" in Boulder Junction

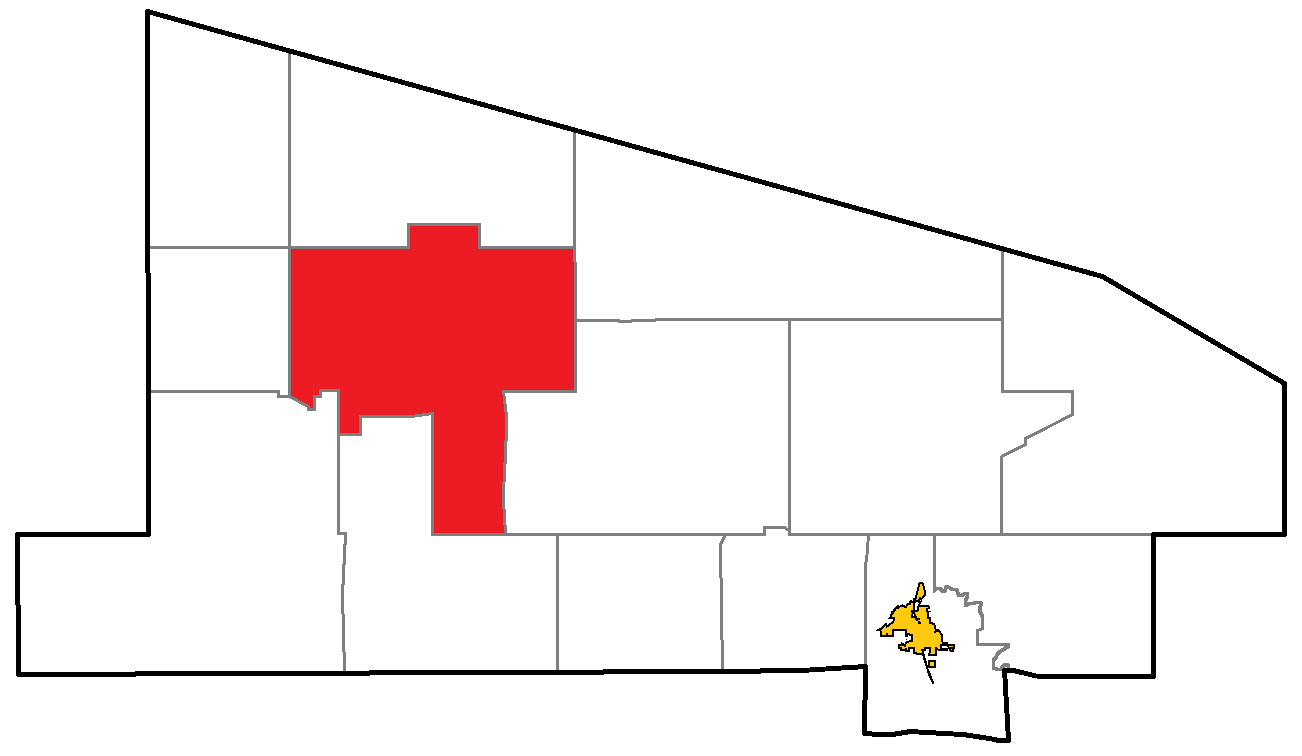
- Location of Boulder Junction, within Vilas County

- Location within Wisconsin Location within the United States
- Coordinates: 46°6′46″N 89°38′38″W
- Country: United States
- State: Wisconsin
- County: Vilas

Area
  - Total: 100.4 sq mi (260.0 km^{2})
  - Land: 81.9 sq mi (212.2 km^{2})
  - Water: 18.5 sq mi (47.8 km^{2})
- Elevation: 1,663 ft (507 m)

Population (2020)
  - Total: 1,057
  - Density: 12.90/sq mi (4.981/km^{2})
- Time zone: UTC-6 (Central (CST))
  - Summer (DST): UTC-5 (CDT)
- Area codes: 715 & 534
- FIPS code: 55-08950
- GNIS feature ID: 1582845
- Website: http://townofboulderjunction.org/

Boulder Junction is a town in Vilas County, Wisconsin, United States. The population was 1,057 at the 2020 census.

== History ==
In 1903, the Milwaukee Railroad laid tracks to the area that became known as Boulder Junction. While the railroad served the booming logging industry, it also attracted outdoors enthusiasts who came to fish and hunt.

Electricity arrived in 1925. The town of Boulder Junction was incorporated in 1927. Phone service began in 1930. Also in the 1930s, wide-scale replanting began of the trees that had been harvested from the land during the logging boom of the previous decades.

== Geography ==
The Town of Boulder Junction is located in central Vilas County. The area encompasses the basin of the Trout and Manitowish Rivers, which flow eventually into the Flambeau River. Much of the town is covered by the Northern Highland-American Legion State Forest, whose headquarters can be found on the east shore of Trout Lake. According to the United States Census Bureau, the town has a total area of 100.4 square miles (260.0 km^{2}), of which 81.9 square miles (212.2 km^{2}) is land and 18.5 square miles (47.8 km^{2}) (18.40%) is water. Most of the water consists of smaller and medium-sized lakes, and most of the land is forested in tree typical of the Great Lakes-St. Lawrence forest band. The census-designated place of Boulder Junction is located in the town.

== Demographics ==
As of the census of 2000, there were 958 people, 445 households, and 303 families residing in the town. The population density was 11.7 people per square mile (4.5/km^{2}). There were 1,407 housing units at an average density of 17.2 per square mile (6.6/km^{2}). The racial makeup of the town was 98.23% White, 0.52% Native American, 0.10% Asian, 0.42% from other races, and 0.73% from two or more races. Hispanic or Latino of any race were 0.52% of the population.

There were 445 households, out of which 20.0% had children under the age of 18 living with them, 61.8% were married couples living together, 4.3% had a female householder with no husband present, and 31.7% were non-families. 28.5% of all households were made up of individuals, and 13.3% had someone living alone who was 65 years of age or older. The average household size was 2.15 and the average family size was 2.62.

In the town, the population was spread out, with 17.4% under the age of 18, 3.8% from 18 to 24, 20.3% from 25 to 44, 32.9% from 45 to 64, and 25.7% who were 65 years of age or older. The median age was 50 years. For every 100 females, there were 103.4 males. For every 100 females age 18 and over, there were 102.8 males.

The median income for a household in the town was $34,722, and the median income for a family was $41,029. Males had a median income of $30,750 versus $25,556 for females. The per capita income for the town was $19,678. About 4.5% of families and 3.9% of the population were below the poverty line, including 2.3% of those under age 18 and 6.7% of those age 65 or over.

== Economy ==
The town's economy depends heavily on tourism. Boulder Junction holds a trademark as the "Musky Capital of the World," based on the fact that more muskies are caught per square mile than any other similar sized area of the world.

== Parks and recreation ==
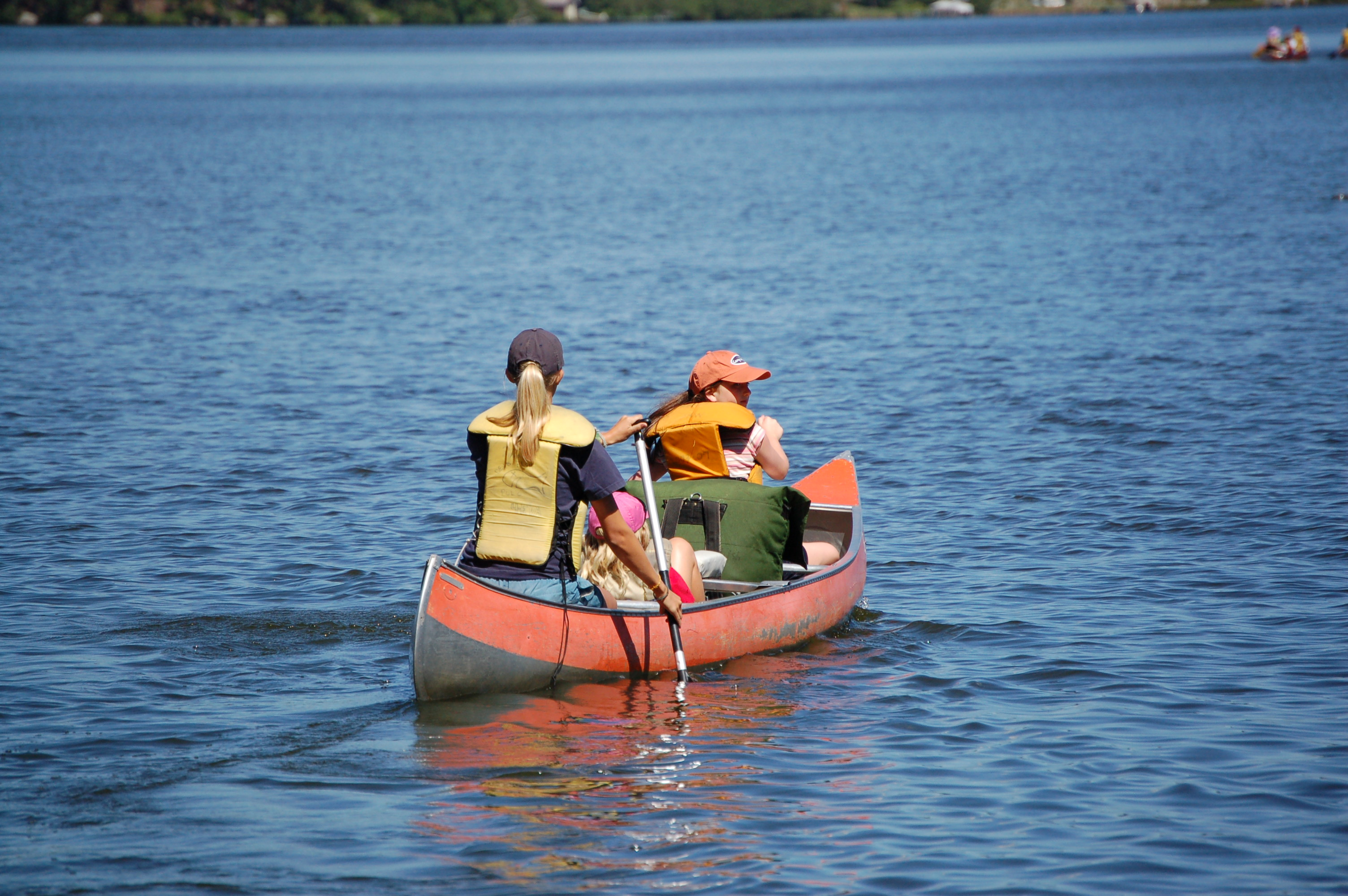
Camp Manito-wish trip groups are frequently seen paddling the lakes and streams in Boulder Junction and the Northern Highland State Forest.

Winter activities include hunting, snowmobiling, cross-country skiing, and snowshoeing. In summer, golf, camping, paddling, fishing, and biking on the 52 mile paved Heart of Vilas bike trail are popular activities. Year-round activities include horseback riding, bird watching, and hiking.

The Northern Highland-American Legion State Forest is located near Boulder Junction. It consists of 25,000 acres of forest and lakes, with 54,000 acres of surface water in 930 lakes and 250 miles of rivers and streams. Within the preserve is 15,000 square miles of northern Wisconsin woodland. Because of the large number of lakes and rivers in the area, Boulder Junction has been proclaimed the “Musky capital of the world”.

Boulder Junction was formerly home to the Northern Wisconsin National Canoe Base, a national base of the Boy Scouts of America.

Boulder Junction is the home of Camp Manito-wish YMCA, which was founded in 1919. Manito-wish offers summer camp programs, wilderness tripping and leadership training for teens, families, schools and youth serving organizations.

Boulder Junction claims to have the largest herd of white (albino) deer in Wisconsin. The city uses white deer on its advertising and some tourists come to the city just to see the deer.

== Transportation ==
USH 51 runs through the southwestern parts of the Town of Boulder Junction, running northwest towards Manitowish Waters and south towards Arbor Vitae, Minocqua and Woodruff. The remainder of the town is served by three Vilas County Highways. CTH M runs north-south from USH 51 through the unincorporated community of Boulder Junction—where it meets with CTH K—and provides the main means of accessing the community. It also serves the headquarters of the Northern Highland-American Legion State Forest and several campgrounds along the east shore of Trout Lake. It proceeds northward to a junction with CTH B in the Town of Presque Isle. CTH K runs from east-west across the town, linking it with North Lakeland Elementary School and Manitowish Waters to the west and Star Lake to the east, via a Wisconsin Rustic Road. CTH H also serves the town, providing a link from CTH K to a junction with U.S. 51 and Lac du Flambeau.

The town of Boulder Junction maintains the Boulder Junction Airport (FAA identifier KBDJ), located approximately 2 miles (3.2 km) north of the unincorporated community of Boulder Junction. This local airport features two grass runways for the use of smaller private aircraft.
