= Kate Pelham Newcomb =

American physician

- Born: July 26, 1885; Wellington, Kansas, U.S.
- Died: May 30, 1956 (aged 70); Woodruff, Wisconsin, U.S.
- Education: University of Buffalo
- Occupation: Physician

Kate Pelham Newcomb (July 26, 1885 – May 30, 1956), or "Dr. Kate" as she was known to her community, was a physician in northern Wisconsin. She practiced medicine in and around Boulder Junction and Woodruff, Wisconsin, in the 1930s, 1940s and 1950s. In 1954 she gained national recognition from television producer Ralph Edwards and the NBC program This Is Your Life for inspiring the "Million Penny Parade", to raise funds for a new hospital.

== Youth and education ==
Born in July 1885 to New York City attorney Thomas Walter Pelham (corporate counsel and later president of the Gillette Razor Company) and his wife Catherine Callahan Pelham, Kate Pelham spent the first years of her life in Wellington, Leoti, and Abilene, Kansas. After the death of her mother the family moved to Buffalo, New York. Pelham attended Public School 19, graduating in June 1900. When her father initially refused to allow her to attend medical school, she became a teacher, serving grade schoolers in Buffalo's Public School 54, but in time he relented and allowed her to enroll in the University of Buffalo. Trained by Dr. Louise Hurrell and others, she entered medical school in September 1913. Pelham earned her M.D. in 1917, specializing in obstetrics. She completed an externship at the New York Infirmary for Indigent Women and Children (later the Lower Manhattan Hospital) on New York's lower east side, where she attended the home deliveries (Pelham would deliver some 800 children here) of the Italian and Armenian women who had come to the infirmary for prenatal care.

== Medical practice ==
In December 1917 Pelham moved to an internship and residency at the Woman's Hospital in Detroit, Michigan. Working alongside physicians Dr. Anna O'Dell, Dr. Grace Clark and Dr. Mary Haskins, Newcomb worked in a section of the hospital donated by Henry Ford that was dedicated to unwed mothers; in time the four women would open a private practice in pediatrics.

During these years Pelham met and married auto plant worker William Ferman (Bill) Newcomb (1886-1961). After Bill Newcomb was diagnosed with lung disease, in 1922 the couple moved to Boulder Junction in northern Wisconsin in search of improved air quality. Kate Newcomb gave up her medical practice to care for her husband. Already frustrated with the medical establishment's inability to address her husband's health issues, after Newcomb's first child died during labor she lost faith in the medical profession.

After nearly a decade in northern Wisconsin, Newcomb eventually met Minocqua physician Thomas Torpy. Noting the well-made bandages Newcomb had applied following a small mishap involving her young son (her second child, William Thomas, born 1928), Torpy suggested she consider returning to medicine. Late in 1931, unable to reach a remote patient during adverse weather, Torpy asked Newcomb to make an emergency call on his behalf. The event prompted her to resume practicing medicine. She saw patients in her home, and kept office hours in various town halls. In 1942 she purchased a home in Woodruff, Wisconsin, and practiced from there for the remainder of her career.

The only physician serving a population of about 7,000, Newcomb's practice extended to Manitowish Waters, Winchester, Winegar and Spider Lake, which meant hundreds of miles of travel every week. Over the course of her career Newcomb delivered between 3,000 and 4,000 children. She is well-remembered for walking miles in snowshoes to get to patients who lived in remote areas; her Model T Ford was fitted with skis. Newcomb also served as a public health office, tackling issues like water pollution and the milk supply.

== The Million Penny Parade ==
Newcomb's practice was hobbled by the absence of any local hospital; the closest, Sacred Heart Hospital, was more than fifty miles away in Tomahawk. Newcomb saw the need for a community hospital in Woodruff, and began raising funds for construction. In 1952, mathematics students at Woodruff-Arbor Vitae High School (many delivered by Newcomb), studying the concept of a "million", decided to hold a penny drive, and collect one million pennies to fund the hospital. Letters were mailed around the county, as area resort and summer camp owners, other businessmen and area families mailed appeals to contacts nationwide. The Chippewa at Lac du Flambeau, another community Newcombe served, contributed as well. Just over 100 days later, the goal was achieved, pennies being sent in from all forty-eight states. On Memorial Day weekend, 1953, a Million Penny Parade celebrated the students’ success, and the donated pennies displayed in the school gym.

On March 17, 1954, the television program This Is Your Life celebrated Newcomb's career. Told she was being flown to a medical convention to honor Sir Alexander Fleming, a London physician who had improved penicillin, Newcomb found herself the subject of the popular show. Host Ralph Edwards described Newcomb's plans to build a hospital and encouraged viewers to donate, and that week, some 274 pounds of mail arrived in Woodruff, containing more than 1.3 million pennies. The 19-bed Lakeland Memorial Hospital, Necomb serving as chief of staff, opened in March 1954. A second Penny Parade was held in celebration. Ninety floats and fifteen marching bands followed Newcomb in the parade, which drew an audience of 25,000. Adele Comandini's 1956 biography, Doctor Kate, Angel on Snowshoes, was a New York Times bestseller.

== Final years and memorialization ==
In May 1956, Newcomb fell as she was exiting the clinic at the Lac du Flambeau Indian reservation. She died May 30, 1956, in St. Mary's hospital in Wausau, Wisconsin, at the age of 70 and is buried next to her husband at the Cemetery of the Pines in Boulder Junction, Vilas County, Wisconsin.

Newcomb has been the subject of memorialization in Wisconsin. In 1988, the Dr. Kate Newcomb Museum opened on the site of Newcomb's office. There, a 15' penny commemorates the Million Penny Parade. The Lakeland Memorial Hospital was in time supplanted by the Howard Young Medical Center, and the hospital became the Dr. Kate Convalescent Center. The original hospital was razed in 2011, and the site redeveloped as the "Dr. Kate Park." Wisconsin Media Lab included "Kate Newcomb: Doctor of the North Woods" among their animated series of Wisconsin Biographies.

== Bibliography ==
- "A Million Pennies for Dr. Kate". Reader’s Digest, June 1954: 9-13.
- Busalacchi, Steve. "This is your life, Dr. Kate Newcomb". Spring 2005 Wisconsin Academy Review Spring 2005: 54-55.
- Comandini, Adele. Doctor Kate, Angel on Snowshoes. Rinehart & Company, Inc., 1956. (Full text available via the HathiTrust)
- French, Lewis C., Milwaukee Journal, October 17, 1948.
- Heide, Kathryn H. Shapers of Wisconsin. Kanosha, Wisconsin: Brookwood Publishers, 1998.
- Nangle, Eleanor. "North Country Doctor". Chicago Daily Tribune, January 23, 1955: K42-K44.
- Pond, Alonzo W. Dr. Kate and the Million Penny Parades. Minocqua, Wisconsin: Ahlborn Printing, 1974.
