= Arbor Vitae, Wisconsin =

- Town
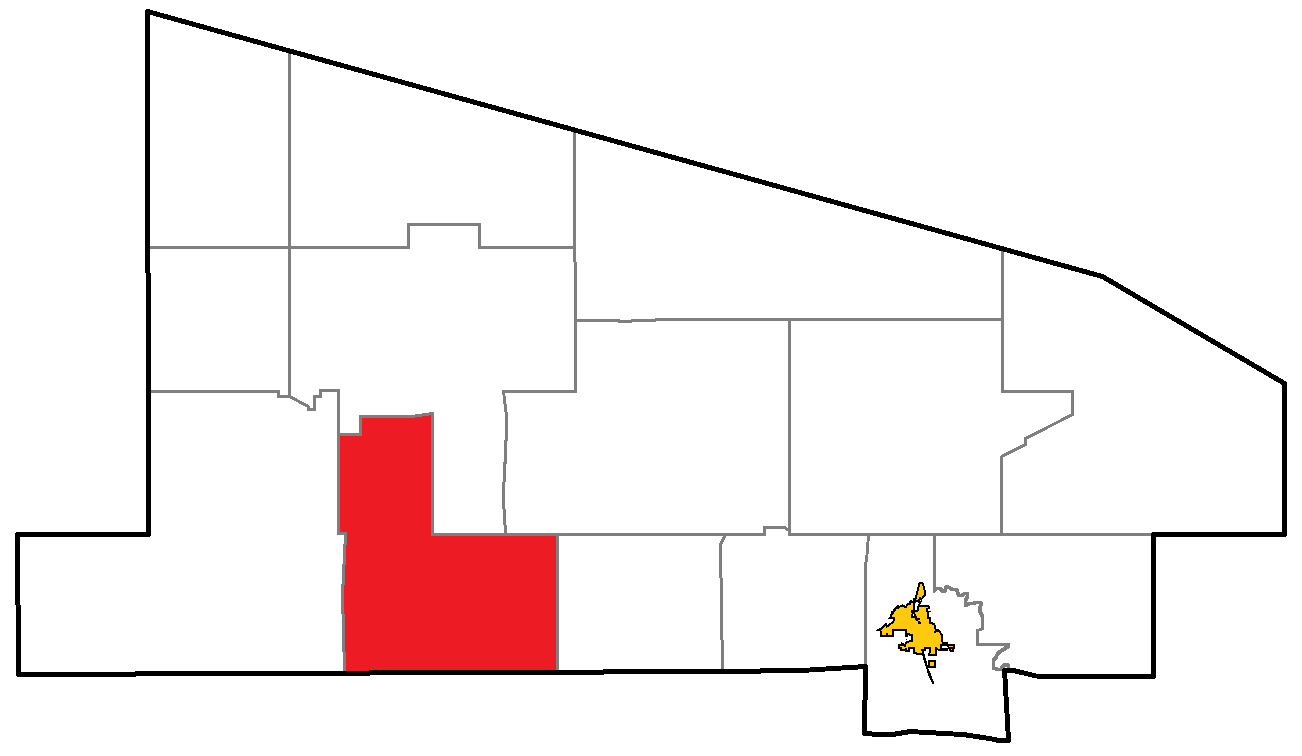
- Location of Arbor Vitae, within Vilas County

- Location in Wisconsin Arbor Vitae (the United States)
- Coordinates: 45°58′N 89°42′W
- Country: United States
- State: Wisconsin
- County: Vilas

Area
  - Total: 71.3 sq mi (184.6 km^{2})
  - Land: 62.6 sq mi (162.1 km^{2})
  - Water: 8.7 sq mi (22.5 km^{2})
- Elevation: 1,316 ft (401 m)

Population (2020)
  - Total: 3,403
  - Density: 54.37/sq mi (20.99/km^{2})
- Time zone: UTC-6 (Central (CST))
  - Summer (DST): UTC-5 (CDT)
- Area codes: 715 & 534
- FIPS code: 55-02450
- GNIS feature ID: 1582704
- Website: http://www.townofarborvitae.org/

Arbor Vitae is a town in Vilas County, Wisconsin, United States. The population was 3,403 at the 2020 census. The unincorporated community of Arbor Vitae is located in the town.

== Geography ==
According to the United States Census Bureau, the town has a total area of 71.3 square miles (184.6 km^{2}), of which 62.6 square miles (162.1 km^{2}) is land and 8.7 square miles (22.5 km^{2}) (12.19%) is water. Nearby surrounding towns include Woodruff, Minocqua, Boulder Junction, and Sayner.

== Transportation ==
=== Airports ===
Arbor Vitae is served by the Lakeland Airport / Noble F. Lee Memorial Field (KARV). Located one mile west of the town, the airport handles approximately 27,000 operations per year, with roughly 88% general aviation and 12% air taxi. The airport has a 5,150 foot asphalt primary runway with approved GPS and LOC approaches (Runway 18/36) and a 3,602 foot asphalt crosswind runway with approved GPS and NDB approaches (Runway 10/28).

The Rhinelander-Oneida County Airport (KRHI) serves Arbor Vitae and surrounding communities with both scheduled commercial jet service and general aviation services.

== Demographics ==
As of the census of 2000, there were 3,153 people, 1,373 households, and 947 families residing in the town. The population density was 50.4 people per square mile (19.5/km^{2}). There were 2,442 housing units at an average density of 39.0 per square mile (15.1/km^{2}). The racial makeup of the town was 97.24% White, 0.03% African American, 1.43% Native American, 0.22% Asian, 0.03% Pacific Islander, 0.06% from other races, and 0.98% from two or more races. Hispanic or Latino of any race were 0.86% of the population.

There were 1,373 households, out of which 23.7% had children under the age of 18 living with them, 58.9% were married couples living together, 6.3% had a female householder with no husband present, and 31.0% were non-families. 25.0% of all households were made up of individuals, and 11.1% had someone living alone who was 65 years of age or older. The average household size was 2.30 and the average family size was 2.73.

In the town, the population was spread out, with 20.8% under the age of 18, 5.0% from 18 to 24, 26.4% from 25 to 44, 26.1% from 45 to 64, and 21.7% who were 65 years of age or older. The median age was 44 years. For every 100 females, there were 100.3 males. For every 100 females age 18 and over, there were 97.6 males.

The median income for a household in the town was $36,472, and the median income for a family was $42,308. Males had a median income of $27,060 versus $20,602 for females. The per capita income for the town was $17,778. About 2.6% of families and 3.1% of the population were below the poverty line, including 4.2% of those under age 18 and 3.0% of those age 65 or over.
