= Minocqua-Hazelhurst-Lake Tomahawk Elementary School =

Coordinates: 45°49′22.8″N 89°42′51.3″W

- 7450 Titus Dr; Hazelhurst, Wisconsin 54548-9139; United States

Information
- Type: Public
- School district: Minocqua J1 School District
- Principal: Rob Way
- Administrator: Dr. James N. Ellis
- Faculty: 42.7 (on FTE basis)
- Grades: PK to 8
- Enrollment: 580 (2008-09)
- Student to teacher ratio: 13.6
- Colors: Black and Gold
- Slogan: The school of choice in the Northwoods
- Athletics conference: Independent
- Sports: Football, Basketball, Track, Gymnastics, Volleyball
- Team name: Firebirds
- Website: http://www.mhlt.org

The Minocqua-Hazelhurst-Lake Tomahawk Elementary School is an elementary school district serving 580 children in grades K-8 living in the towns of Minocqua, Hazelhurst and Lake Tomahawk. The district encompasses 350 square miles (910 km^{2}) in Oneida County and is considered part of “The Northwoods” of North Central Wisconsin. MHLT is one of four elementary districts that feed into Lakeland Union High School. Each district is administered by its own Board of Education.
