= Lakeland Airport =

Lakeland Airport Noble F. Lee Memorial Field
- IATA: ARV; ICAO: KARV; FAA LID: ARV

Summary
- Airport type: Public
- Owner: Lakeland Airport Commission
- Serves: Minocqua, Wisconsin; Woodruff, Wisconsin
- Location: Arbor Vitae, Wisconsin
- Opened: December 1945
- Time zone: CST (UTC−06:00)
  - Summer (DST): CDT (UTC−05:00)
- Elevation AMSL: 1,630 ft / 497 m
- Coordinates: 45°55′40″N 089°43′51″W

Map
- Location of airport in Wisconsin ARV (the United States)

Runways
Direction	Length		Surface
Direction	ft	m	Surface
18/36	5,150	1,570	Asphalt
10/28	3,602	1,098	Asphalt

Statistics
- Aircraft operations (2023): 27,190
- Based aircraft (2024): 36
- Source: Federal Aviation Administration

Lakeland Airport (IATA: ARV, ICAO: KARV, FAA LID: ARV), also known as Noble F. Lee Memorial Field, is a public airport near Arbor Vitae, a town in Vilas County, Wisconsin, United States. The airport is three miles (5 km) northwest of the central business district of Minocqua and northwest of Woodruff, both cities in Oneida County, just south of the Vilas County border. It is included in the Federal Aviation Administration (FAA) National Plan of Integrated Airport Systems for 2025–2029, in which it is categorized as a local general aviation facility. It is owned by the Lakeland Airport Commission.

== Facilities and aircraft ==
Lakeland Airport covers an area of 455 acres (184 ha) at an elevation of 1,630 feet (497 m) above mean sea level. The airport contains two asphalt paved runways: the primary runway 18/36 measuring 5,150 x 100 ft (1,570 x 30 m) with approved GPS and LOC approaches and the crosswind runway 10/28 measuring 3,602 x 75 ft (1,098 x 23 m) with approved GPS and NDB approaches. The Arbor Vitae NDB navaid, (ARV) frequency 221 kHz, is located on the field.

For the 12-month period ending August 10, 2023, the airport had 27,190 aircraft operations, an average of 74 per day: 88% general aviation, 12% air taxi and less than 1% military. In August 2024, there were 36 aircraft based at this airport: 32 single-engine, 3 multi-engine and 1 jet.

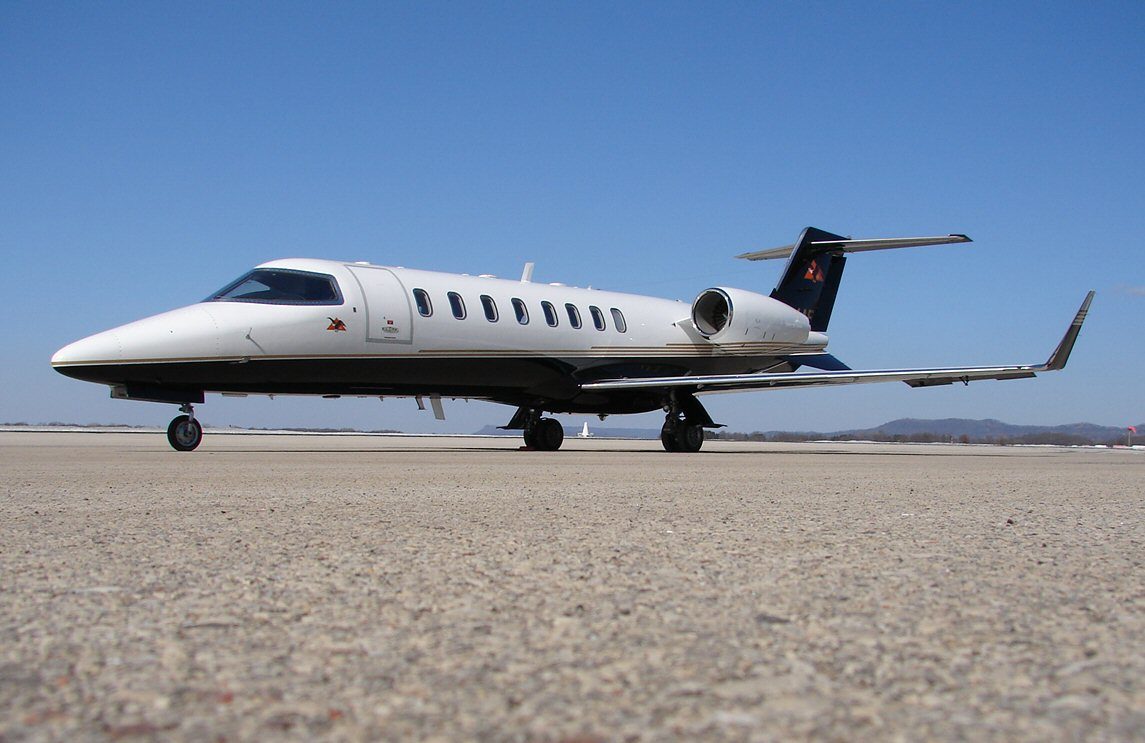
The Learjet 45

== Incidents ==
- On May 25, 2003, at 1754 central daylight time, a Piper PA-31P Pressurized Navajo crashed and was destroyed by fire after takeoff from the airport's runway 36. All four occupants were killed.
- On September 12, 2008, a Cirrus SR22 arriving from General Mitchell International Airport crashed about a half mile southwest of the airport. All three people on board died.

== See also ==
- List of airports in Wisconsin
