= Boulder Junction (CDP), Wisconsin =

Census-designated place in Wisconsin, United States

Boulder Junction, Wisconsin
- Census-designated place
- Location within Wisconsin
- Coordinates: 46°06′48″N 89°38′41″W
- Country: United States
- State: Wisconsin
- County: Vilas

Area
  - Total: 1.146 sq mi (2.97 km^{2})
  - Land: 1.146 sq mi (2.97 km^{2})
  - Water: 0 sq mi (0 km^{2})
- Elevation: 1,650 ft (500 m)

Population (2020)
  - Total: 179
  - Density: 156/sq mi (60.3/km^{2})
- Time zone: UTC-6 (Central (CST))
  - Summer (DST): UTC-5 (CDT)
- ZIP code: 54512
- Area codes: 715 & 534
- GNIS feature ID: 1562091

Boulder Junction is an unincorporated census-designated place located in the town of Boulder Junction, Vilas County, Wisconsin, United States. Boulder Junction is 23 miles (37 km) northwest of Eagle River. Boulder Junction has a post office with ZIP code 54512. As of the 2010 census, its population was 183.
