= Min-Aqua Bat Water Ski Club =

The Min-Aqua Bat Water Ski Club is the world's longest consecutively running amateur water ski show. It performs in Minocqua, Wisconsin from the middle of June until the end of August. As they have for many years, the shows continue to take place every Sunday, Wednesday, and Friday on Lake Minocqua. The team was formed in 1950.
