= Raven Trail =

Wisconsin recreational trail

Coordinates: 45°52′09″N 89°39′06″W

The Raven Trail is a recreational trail in Northern Highland-American Legion State Forest in Woodruff, Wisconsin.

The trail has five loops available for use. The Yellow Loop is one and a half miles (2.4 km) long. No pets are allowed on this loop. The Green and Blue Loops are both three and a half miles (5.6 km) miles long and rated intermediate difficulty. The Red Loop is five miles (8 km) long and is rated expert. Pets are allowed on the Green, Blue, and Red Loops when there is no snow. These trails are open for hiking and cross country skiing.

The Lakeland Area Mountain Bike Organization has recently created a skills course on a portion of the Raven Trail. Depending on which loop an individual uses, they may see Clear Lake, Inkpot Lake, or Hemlock Lake. Clear Lake Campground is located close by.
