= Bearskin State Trail =

Trail in Wisconsin, USA

The Bearskin State Trail is a 21.5 mile long trail in Wisconsin from Minocqua to Tomahawk.
