= Little Rock Lake (Vilas County, Wisconsin) =

Lake in Wisconsin

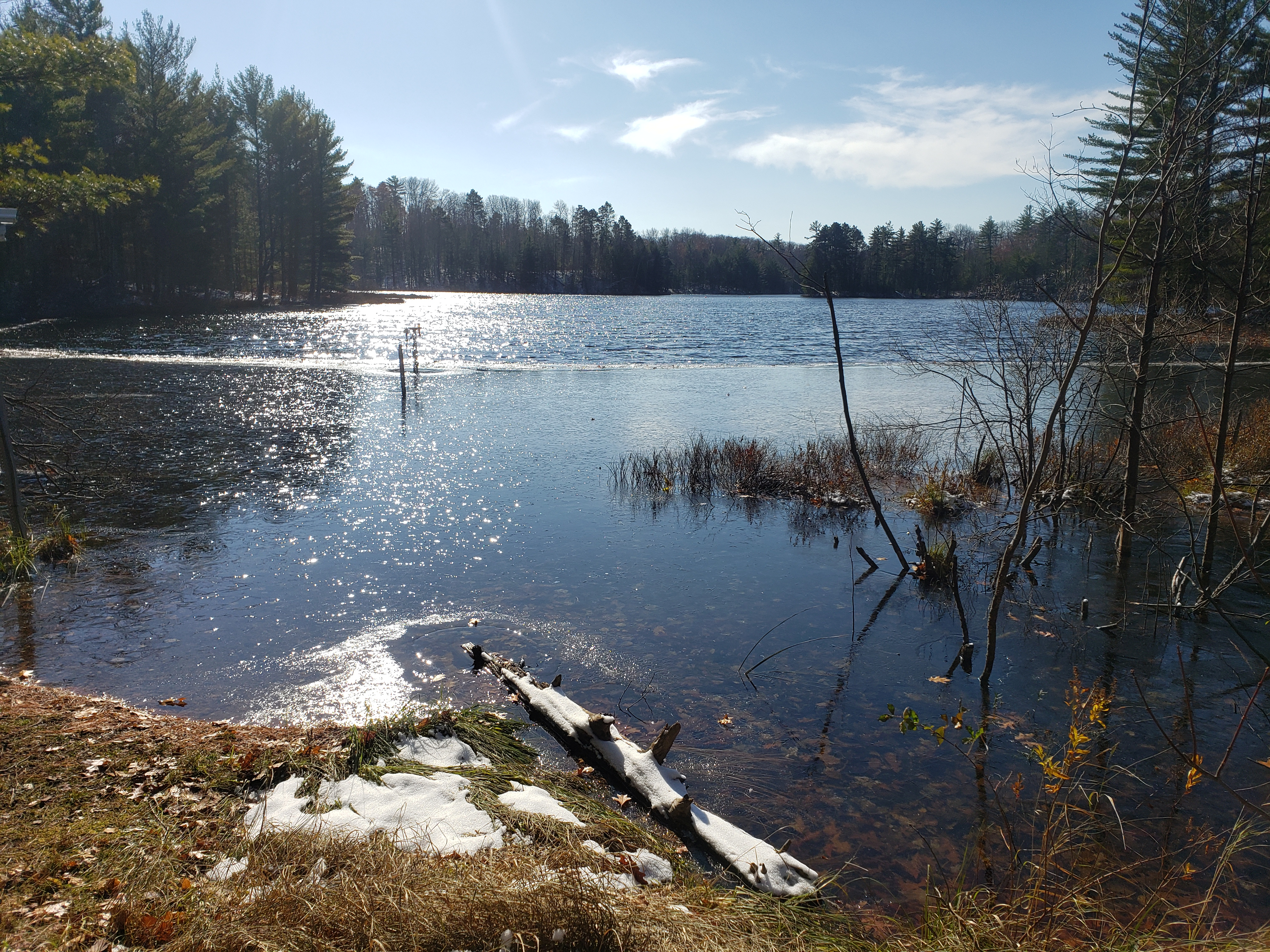
- Little Rock Lake, 2020

- Location within Wisconsin
- Coordinates: 45.9957441°N 89.7024896°W
- Type: Lake
- Basin countries: United States
- Surface area: 0.16 km^{2} (0.062 sq mi)

Little Rock Lake is a lake in Vilas County, Wisconsin. It is located in the Northern Highland–American Legion State Forest and administered by the Wisconsin Department of Natural Resources.

== Characteristics ==
Little Rock Lake is a 0.16 km2 (40 acre) mesotrophic lake formed by glacial processes 10,000 to 25,000 years ago. The lake consists of two main basins that are separated by a narrow water passage. It is typically frozen over from late fall to early spring.

=== Ecology ===
The surrounding region and canopy over the lake is a mix of hardwood and coniferous forests, including speckled alder, white pine, and white and black spruce trees. Fish found in the lake include the central mudminnow, rock bass, yellow perch, and largemouth bass.

== History ==
The hydrology and water quality of Little Rock Lake has been studied since the 1980s. In 1984, the two water basins that make up Little Rock Lake were separated by a plastic curtain. One side was used for experimentation, and the other side used as a control. Many studies have been conducted, including research into the effects of acid rain. Water quality, biological, geological and chemical cycles have also been monitored. The curtain was removed in 2013. In 2017, the National Ecological Observatory Network began to monitor the lake.

Recreational fishing is popular at Little Rock Lake.
