= Northern Highland-American Legion State Forest =

State Forest in Iron, Oneida and Vilas Counties, WIsconsin

- Beach at the Crystal Lake campground in Vilas County.

- Location within Wisconsin Location within the United States
- Interactive map of Northern Highland-American Legion State Forest
- Location: Vilas, Oneida, and Iron counties, Wisconsin, United States
- Coordinates: 46°2′54″N 89°39′16″W
- Area: 236,000 acres (96,000 ha)
- Established: 1925
- Administrator: Wisconsin Department of Natural Resources
- Website: Official website
- Wisconsin State Forests

Northern Highland-American Legion State Forest is a Wisconsin state forest of more than 236,000 acres (96,000 ha) across Vilas, Oneida, and Iron counties in north-central Wisconsin. The state forest includes 900 lakes. Prominent rivers are the Wisconsin, Flambeau, and Manitowish. The state forest supports a large variety of outdoor recreation activities including camping, hiking, snowmobiling, cycling, boating, fishing, hunting, and birdwatching. In addition to recreational activities the state forest also hosts a number of research programs. The forest is a state-managed timber resource providing opportunities for commercial logging, individual firewood collection, and individual Christmas tree harvesting.

== Camping ==
The forest offers abundant opportunities for campers with a wide range of facilities. The state forest hosts modern, group, rustic and primitive campgrounds. Additionally special permits can be obtained for backcountry backpack camping and deer-hunting camping.

== See also ==
- Little Rock Lake
- Raven Trail
