= Woodruff, Wisconsin =

Woodruff, Wisconsin Daashkiboojiganing
- Town
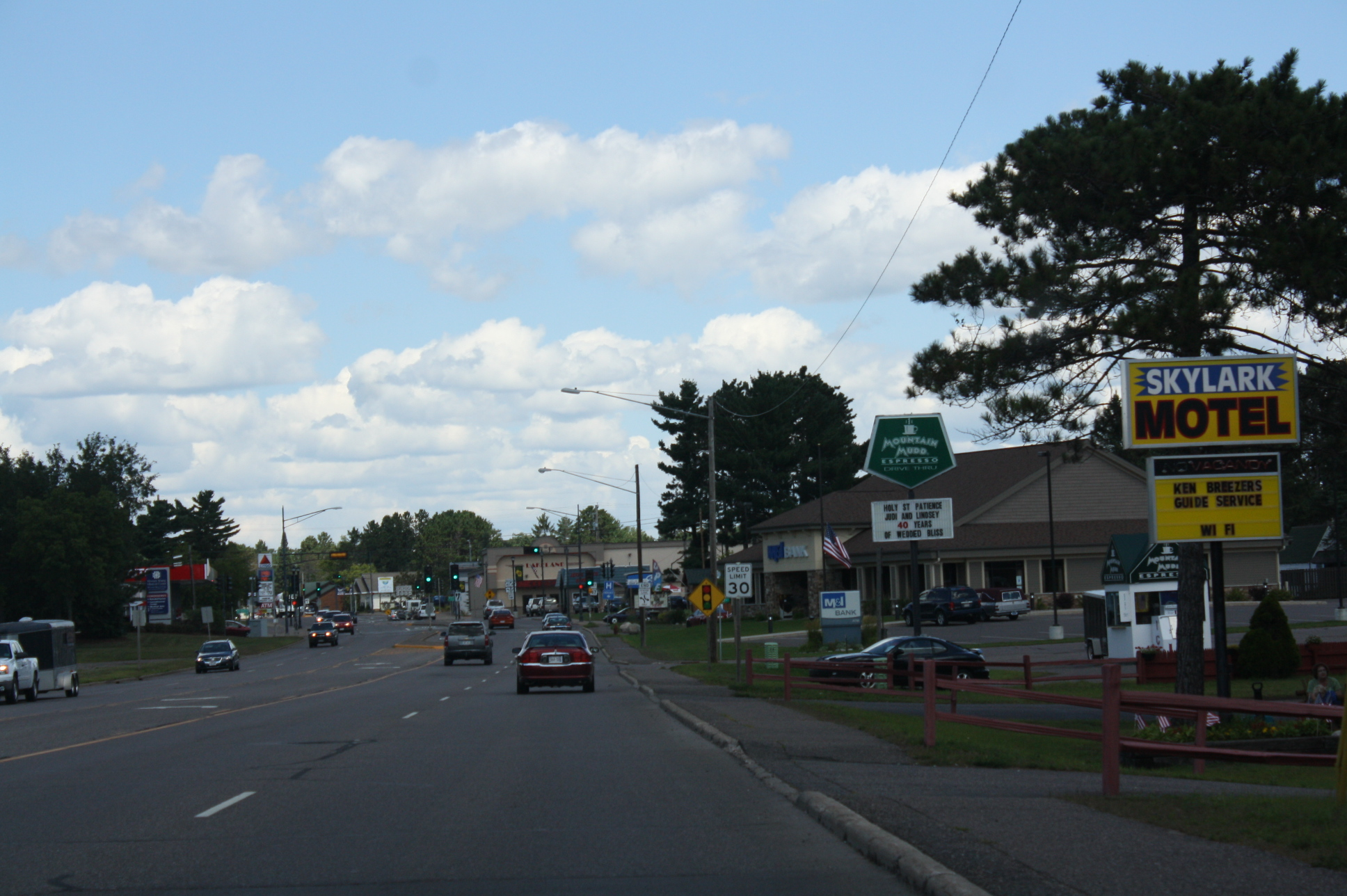

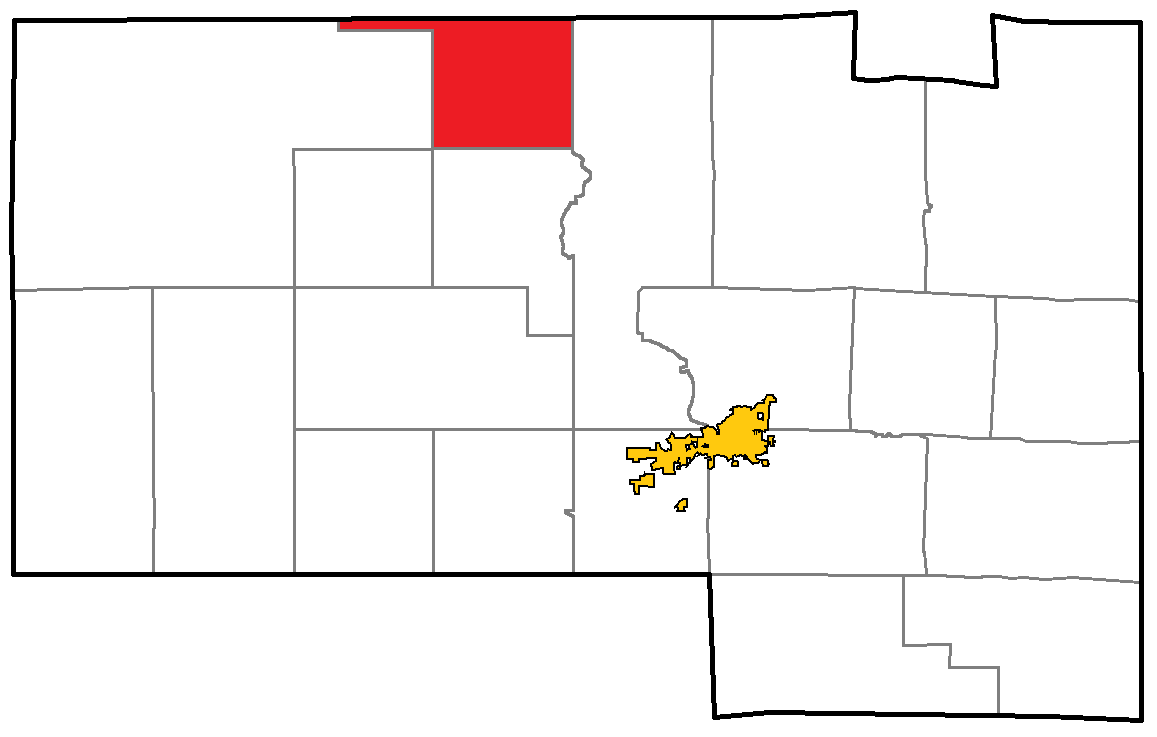
- Location of Woodruff, within Oneida County

- Location within Wisconsin Woodruff (the United States)
- Coordinates: 45°52′8″N 89°38′48″W
- Country: United States
- State: Wisconsin
- County: Oneida

Area
  - Total: 35.6 sq mi (92.1 km^{2})
  - Land: 28.5 sq mi (73.9 km^{2})
  - Water: 7.0 sq mi (18.2 km^{2})
- Elevation: 1,594 ft (486 m)

Population (2020)
  - Total: 2,044
  - Density: 71.6/sq mi (27.7/km^{2})
- Time zone: UTC-6 (Central (CST))
  - Summer (DST): UTC-5 (CDT)
- Area codes: 715 & 534
- FIPS code: 55-88950
- GNIS feature ID: 1584479
- Website: https://townofwoodruffwi.gov/

Woodruff (Ojibwe: Daashkiboojiganing) is a town in Oneida County, Wisconsin, United States. The population was 2,044 at the 2020 census. The census-designated place of Woodruff is located in the town.

== Geography ==
According to the United States Census Bureau, the town has a total area of 35.6 square miles (92.1 km^{2}), of which 28.5 square miles (73.9 km^{2}) is land and 7.0 square miles (18.2 km^{2}) (19.79%) is water.

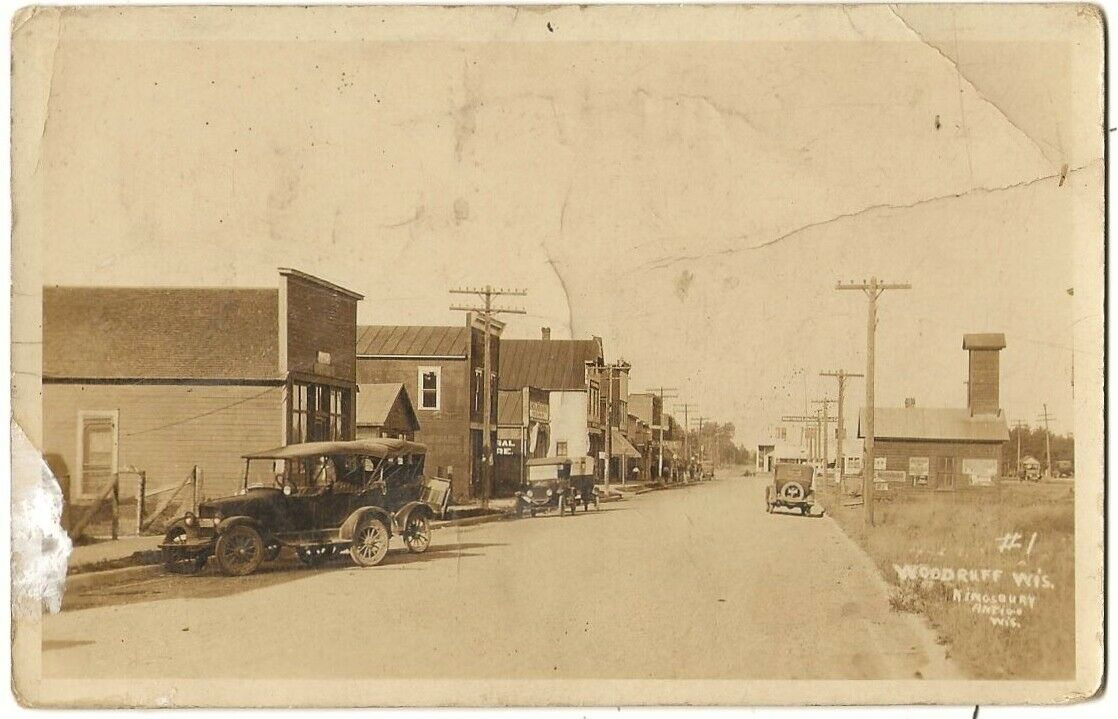
Woodruff, Wisconsin seen c. 1925

== Demographics ==
As of the census of 2000, there were 1,982 people, 866 households, and 538 families residing in the town. The population density was 69.5 people per square mile (26.8/km^{2}). There were 1,515 housing units at an average density of 53.1 per square mile (20.5/km^{2}). The racial makeup of the town was 96.72% White, 0.25% African American, 1.51% Native American, 0.15% Asian, 0.10% Pacific Islander, 0.50% from other races, and 0.76% from two or more races. Hispanic or Latino of any race were 1.06% of the population.

There were 866 households, out of which 25.3% had children under the age of 18 living with them, 52.5% were married couples living together, 6.7% had a female householder with no husband present, and 37.8% were non-families. 33.5% of all households were made up of individuals, and 15.9% had someone living alone who was 65 years of age or older. The average household size was 2.22 and the average family size was 2.83.

In the town, the population was spread out, with 21.8% under the age of 18, 3.9% from 18 to 24, 24.2% from 25 to 44, 25.9% from 45 to 64, and 24.2% who were 65 years of age or older. The median age was 45 years. For every 100 females, there were 88.0 males. For every 100 females age 18 and over, there were 85.0 males.

The median income for a household in the town was $35,335, and the median income for a family was $45,815. Males had a median income of $32,009 versus $21,964 for females. The per capita income for the town was $20,508. About 8.3% of families and 10.8% of the population were below the poverty line, including 15.5% of those under age 18 and 6.3% of those age 65 or over.

== Transportation ==
=== Major highways ===
U.S. 51 Northbound US 51 routes to Hurley. Southbound, US 51 routes to Merrill, Wisconsin.
WIS 47 travels north to Lac du Flambeau and south to Rhinelander.
WIS 70 travels east to Eagle River and west to Fifield.

=== Airports ===
The Lakeland Airport (KARV) is located just northwest of Woodruff.

The Rhinelander-Oneida County Airport (KRHI) serves Woodruff and surrounding communities with both scheduled commercial jet service and general aviation services.

== Points of interest ==
Woodruff is home to the world's largest penny (known to local residents as "The Big Penny"). Made of concrete, the penny weighs 17,452 pounds. It commemorates a fundraising stunt engineered by Kate Pelham Newcomb, who inspired schoolchildren to collect pennies to raise money for a hospital in Woodruff. 1.7 million pennies were collected.

== Notable people ==
- Dr. David Davidson, world-renowned cardiologist, summers in Woodruff
- Gerald J. Boileau, U.S. Representative, was born in Woodruff
- Kate Pelham Newcomb, in 1954 Newcomb gained national recognition from television producer Ralph Edwards and the NBC program This Is Your Life for inspiring the "Million Penny Parade", to raise funds for a new hospital

== See also ==
- Raven Trail
