= Boulder Junction Airport =

- IATA: none; ICAO: KBDJ; FAA LID: BDJ

Summary
- Airport type: Public
- Owner: Town of Boulder Junction
- Serves: Boulder Junction, Wisconsin
- Opened: October 1947
- Time zone: CST (UTC−06:00)
  - Summer (DST): CDT (UTC−05:00)
- Elevation AMSL: 1,662 ft (507 m)
- Coordinates: 46°08′13″N 089°38′51″W

Map
- Location of airport in Wisconsin BDJ (the United States)

Runways
Direction	Length		Surface
Direction	ft	m	Surface
5/23	3,821	1,165	Turf
16/34	3,214	980	Turf

Statistics
- Aircraft operations (2023): 450
- Based aircraft (2024): 0
- Sources: FAA, Town of Boulder Junction

Boulder Junction Airport (ICAO: KBDJ, FAA LID: BDJ) is a public use airport located two nautical miles (4 km) north of the central business district of Boulder Junction, a town in Vilas County, Wisconsin, United States. It is owned by the Town of Boulder Junction.

Although many U.S. airports use the same three-letter location identifier for the FAA and IATA, this facility is assigned BDJ by the FAA but has no designation from the IATA (which assigned BDJ to Syamsudin Noor Airport in Banjarmasin, South Kalimantan, Indonesia).

== Facilities and aircraft ==
Boulder Junction Airport covers an area of 40 acres (16 ha) at an elevation of 1,662 feet (507 m) above mean sea level. It has two runways with turf surfaces: 5/23 is 3,821 by 165 feet (1,165 x 50 m) and 16/34 is 3,214 by 160 feet (980 x 49 m).

For the 12-month period ending August 10, 2023, the airport had 450 aircraft operations, an average of 38 per month: 89% general aviation and 11% air taxi. In July 2024, there were no aircraft based at this airport.

== See also ==
- List of airports in Wisconsin
