= Minocqua, Wisconsin =

Minocqua, Wisconsin Minwaakwaa
- Town
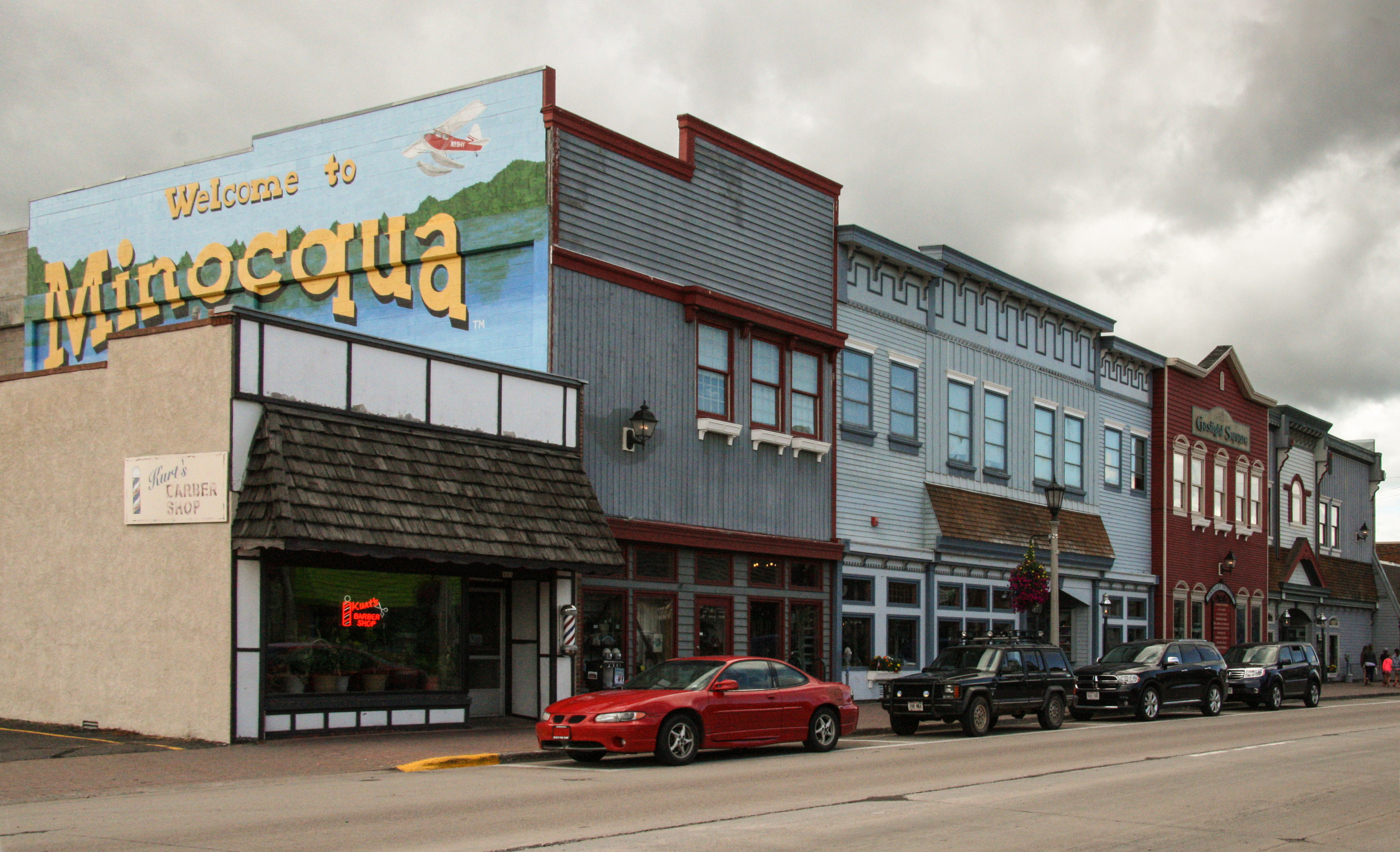
- Downtown Minocqua
- Nickname: The Island City
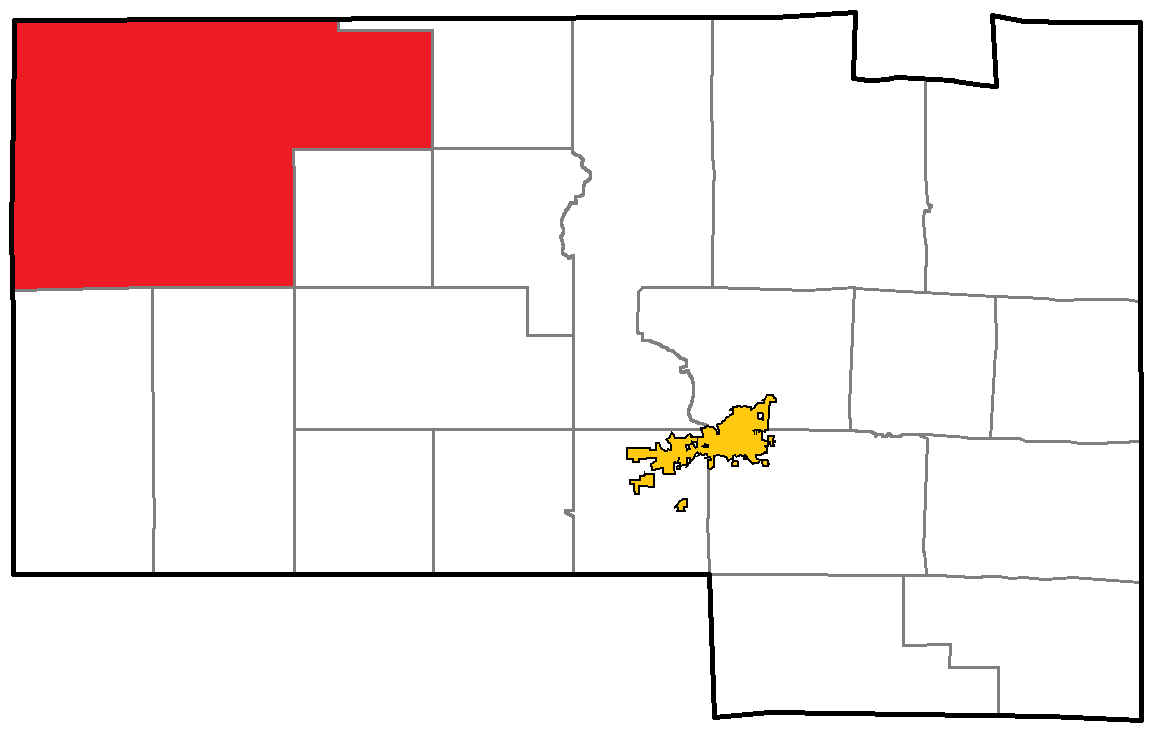
- Location of Minocqua, within Oneida County
- Interactive map of Minocqua, Wisconsin
- Location within Wisconsin Location within the United States
- Coordinates: 45°52′14.3″N 89°42′33.0″W
- Country: United States
- State: Wisconsin
- County: Oneida
- Founded: 1889

Government
  - Chairman: Mark Hartzheim

Area
  - Total: 168.1 sq mi (435.3 km^{2})
  - Land: 150.8 sq mi (390.6 km^{2})
  - Water: 17.3 sq mi (44.8 km^{2})
- Elevation: 1,598 ft (487 m)

Population (2020)
  - Total: 5,062
  - Density: 33.57/sq mi (12.96/km^{2})
- Time zone: UTC-6 (Central (CST))
  - Summer (DST): UTC-5 (CDT)
- Area codes: 715 & 534
- FIPS code: 55-53225
- GNIS feature ID: 1583727

Minocqua (Ojibwe: Minwaakwaa) is a town in northwestern Oneida County, Wisconsin, United States. The population was 5,062 at 2025 estimates, representing no change from the 2020 census. The Minocqua census-designated place and the unincorporated community of Rantz are both located in the town. Minocqua is commonly referred to as "The Island City."

== History ==
Minocqua was officially organized in the year 1889. Although there are varying explanations regarding the meaning of the word "Minocqua", most credit its origin to the Island's first inhabitants, the Ojibwe. The town Minocqua is named after "Ninocqua", the Ojibwe name that is defined as "noon-day-rest".

In the late 1800s, Minocqua was a logging town. Minocqua Clawson was the first child born in the town. Clawson Hill was a famous landmark in town, and it is now the current location of the Pointe Resort & Hotel at the south end of the Highway 51 bridge.

The construction of railroads was a critical component of Minocqua's early growth. The Milwaukee Road originally came to the area to provide access to timber. Later, railroads catered to sportsmen and tourists, transforming Minocqua into the vacation getaway it remains to this day. The two railroad trestles that brought trains to the Island are still intact and serve as the trailhead for the Bearskin State Trail that provides hiking and biking in summer, and snowmobiling in winter.

Much of the town's business district was destroyed by a major fire in 1912. Many of the buildings on the main street today were designed and built after the fire. Although the last several decades have brought a higher percentage of visitor-oriented retail stores, the downtown still retains a U.S. post office, banks, restaurants, and a barbershop. The Island, Minocqua's city center, contains the Campanile Center for the Arts, the Minocqua Police Department, Minocqua Fire Department, and the Minocqua Community Center, which houses the town offices and public library.

During the late 1980s and early 1990s, Minocqua was a central flashpoint in the "Walleye Wars," a series of intense protests against the off-reservation spearfishing rights of the Lac du Flambeau Ojibwe. The town served as headquarters for militant anti-treaty groups like Stop Treaty Abuse (STA), hosting massive rallies that drew over a thousand demonstrators. Historians attribute the intensity of Minocqua's protests to local working-class anxieties over rapid rural gentrification and a changing tourism economy.

Landmarks on the Island include Torpy Park, the Belle-Isle building and the Minocqua Community Center. Town offices and the Minocqua Public Library are located in the Minocqua Community Center. Bosacki's Boat House burned to the ground in 1972. Although state regulations prohibited the structure being rebuilt over water, a public outcry convinced the DNR to allow it to be rebuilt where it had originally stood.

== Geography ==
According to the United States Census Bureau, the town has a total area of 168.1 square miles (435.4 km^{2}), of which 150.8 square miles (390.6 km^{2}) is land and 17.3 square miles (44.8 km^{2}) is water for a total area of 10.29% water.

Termed the "Island City," a portion of the town is situated on what was an actual island, which is accessible by bridge on Highway 51 and "the fill" to the north. Much of Minocqua has sandy soil, although areas of the far northwest and the northeast are clay. The majority of the soil is highly acidic, and many areas are covered by forests.

The highest point in Minocqua is Squirrel Hill, located near Winter Park (1735 ft). The highest structure in Minocqua is the Lakeland Sanitary District water tower, a steel tank on Hwy 51 North put in place in the 1960s during the winter.

The community of Bo-di-Lac (short for "Booth-Diamond-Lac du Flambeau) is located in the western portion of the town bordered by Squirrel Lake, Diamond Lake, Booth Lake, and the town of Lac du Flambeau.

=== Climate ===
Minocqua has a humid continental climate (Köppen Dfb) with long, cold winters and mild, humid summers.

Climate data for Minocqua, Wisconsin, 1991–2020 normals, 1903-2020 extremes: 1601ft (488m)
Month	Jan	Feb	Mar	Apr	May	Jun	Jul	Aug	Sep	Oct	Nov	Dec	Year
Record high °F (°C)	56 (13)	60 (16)	78 (26)	90 (32)	99 (37)	99 (37)	106 (41)	99 (37)	95 (35)	86 (30)	75 (24)	57 (14)	106 (41)
Mean maximum °F (°C)	38.3 (3.5)	44.9 (7.2)	57.3 (14.1)	72.7 (22.6)	82.7 (28.2)	87.3 (30.7)	87.8 (31.0)	87.0 (30.6)	82.4 (28.0)	73.6 (23.1)	56.4 (13.6)	41.4 (5.2)	90.1 (32.3)
Mean daily maximum °F (°C)	19.7 (−6.8)	25.1 (−3.8)	36.8 (2.7)	49.2 (9.6)	63.8 (17.7)	73.1 (22.8)	76.7 (24.8)	74.6 (23.7)	66.5 (19.2)	52.3 (11.3)	36.6 (2.6)	24.7 (−4.1)	49.9 (10.0)
Daily mean °F (°C)	10.5 (−11.9)	14.0 (−10.0)	24.7 (−4.1)	37.4 (3.0)	51.6 (10.9)	61.9 (16.6)	65.5 (18.6)	63.2 (17.3)	55.6 (13.1)	42.9 (6.1)	29.2 (−1.6)	17.0 (−8.3)	39.5 (4.1)
Mean daily minimum °F (°C)	1.2 (−17.1)	2.8 (−16.2)	12.6 (−10.8)	25.7 (−3.5)	39.4 (4.1)	50.8 (10.4)	54.4 (12.4)	51.7 (10.9)	44.8 (7.1)	33.5 (0.8)	21.9 (−5.6)	9.4 (−12.6)	29.0 (−1.7)
Mean minimum °F (°C)	−22.2 (−30.1)	−20.8 (−29.3)	−12.9 (−24.9)	9.8 (−12.3)	25.6 (−3.6)	35.3 (1.8)	42.7 (5.9)	40.1 (4.5)	29.5 (−1.4)	20.2 (−6.6)	3.3 (−15.9)	−14.9 (−26.1)	−25.7 (−32.1)
Record low °F (°C)	−48 (−44)	−48 (−44)	−36 (−38)	−18 (−28)	15 (−9)	25 (−4)	30 (−1)	30 (−1)	19 (−7)	3 (−16)	−18 (−28)	−36 (−38)	−48 (−44)
Average precipitation inches (mm)	1.27 (32)	1.07 (27)	1.72 (44)	2.88 (73)	3.76 (96)	4.36 (111)	4.10 (104)	3.65 (93)	3.56 (90)	3.67 (93)	2.08 (53)	1.67 (42)	33.79 (858)
Average snowfall inches (cm)	20.40 (51.8)	16.50 (41.9)	16.90 (42.9)	8.80 (22.4)	0.70 (1.8)	0.00 (0.00)	0.00 (0.00)	0.00 (0.00)	0.00 (0.00)	2.90 (7.4)	12.80 (32.5)	19.70 (50.0)	98.7 (250.7)
Source 1: NOAA
Source 2: XMACIS (records & monthly max/mins)

== Demographics ==
As of the 2025 census, there are 5,062 people living in the town. There are a total of 4,835 housing units in town of which 2,493 are seasonal in nature.

The racial makeup of the town is 96.1% White, 0.2% African American, 1.7% Native American, 0.8% Asian, 0.1% from other races, and 1.2% from two or more races. 0.8% of the population are Hispanic or Latino of any race.

26.4% of the town's population is age 65 or older while 16.3% is below the age of 18. The median age is 51.6 years.

The average household size is 2.11 persons.

== Arts and culture ==
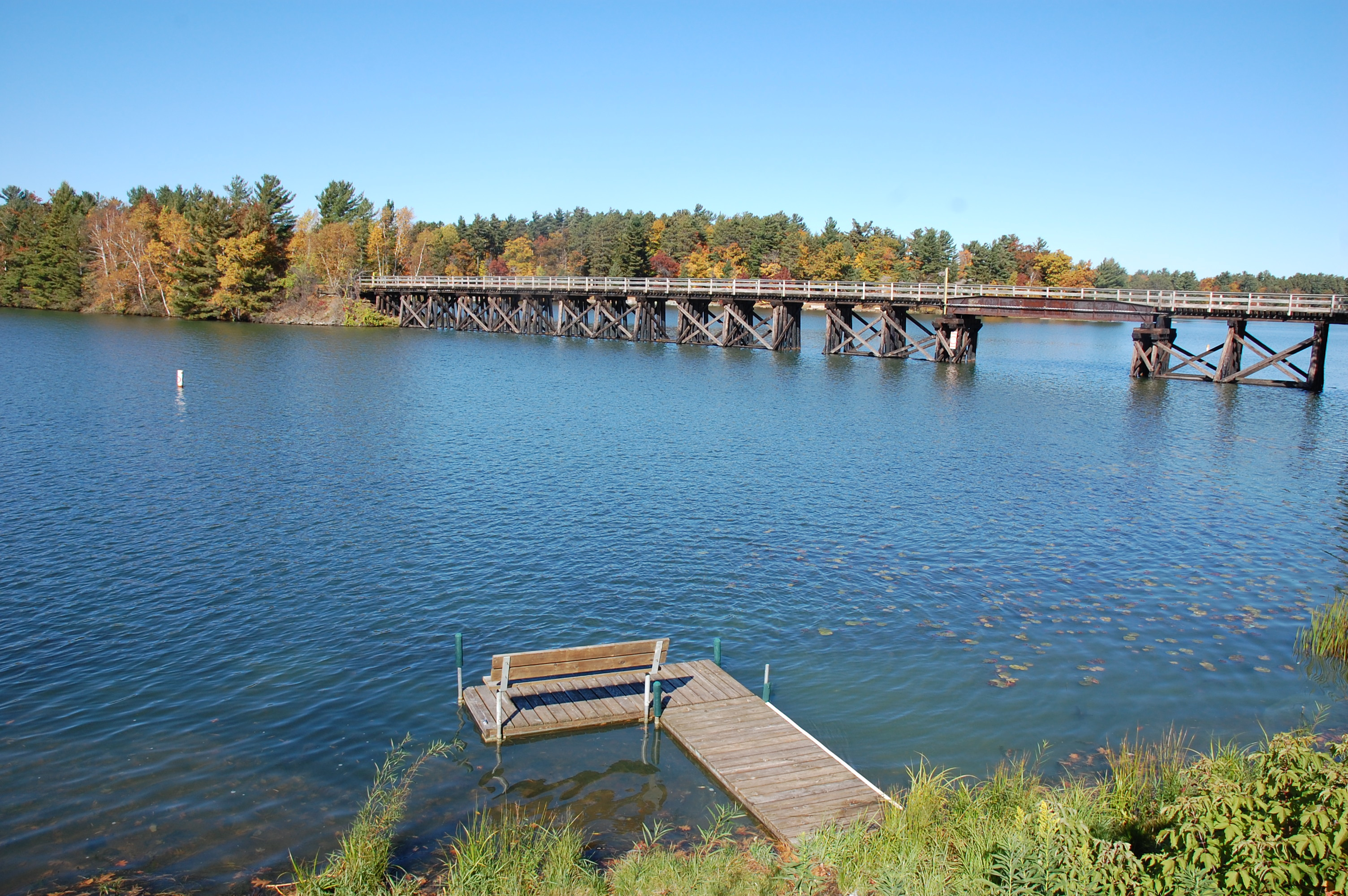
View of the old railroad trestle (now Bearskin Trail) over Lake Minocqua

Tourism plays a substantial role in the economy and culture of Minocqua. As a forested lake community, there are many outdoor summer activities, such as fishing, camping, waterskiing, boating, hiking, bike riding, berry collecting, and swimming.

A business strip runs through the downtown ("The Island"), with tourist attractions and shopping. Minocqua's nightlife includes bars hosting live music in the summer. A Fourth of July parade is presented annually. Events include dancing, live music, fireworks, and a Min-Aqua Bat waterski and boat show.

During the fall, rifle and bow hunting draw many visitors, as does the annual downtown merchants' Beef-a-Rama held the last Saturday in September. Winter activities include snowmobile festivals, Nordic (cross country) skiing, ice fishing, downhill skiing in nearby hills, snow tubing, sleigh rides, and snowmobiling. Minocqua is home to Minocqua Winter Park, a cross-country skiing venue, as well as a sledding hill and ice-skating pond.

Minocqua is home to one of the world's oldest amateur water ski teams, the Min-Aqua Bats. The Min-Aqua bats have been performing at the Aqua Bowl for over 70 summers as a nonprofit organization, with regular shows starting in 1952.

Arts activities include the Campanile Center for the Arts which operates year-round, offering an array of high quality artists to captivate, intrigue and inspire audiences. The Campanile also provides music, theater, and visual art instruction. The Minocqua Museum features exhibits about the town's early history. The U.S. flag that was lowered by the last U.S. soldiers to depart from the Vietnam War is on exhibit at the American Legion Post in Minocqua.

== Government ==
The town board, consisting of a town chairman and four supervisors, is responsible for governing the citizens of Minocqua. There have been 30 town chairmen in the history of Minocqua. The list of early town chairmen include A.O. Dorwin, Lincoln Abraham, Jacob Huber, Thomas Bolger, William Schlecht, and Dr. Torpy.

Minocqua is entirely located in Wisconsin's 34th Assembly, 12th Senate, and 7th Congressional District.

== Education ==
Minocqua has a public elementary school, Minocqua-Hazelhurst-Lake Tomahawk Elementary School, a private Lutheran elementary/middle school, Trinity Lutheran School, and a high school, Lakeland Union High School.

== Transportation ==
Bus service is provided by Bay Area Rural Transit.

The Lakeland Airport (KARV) is located 3 miles northwest of the central business district of Minocqua. The Rhinelander-Oneida County Airport (KRHI) located 25 miles to the southeast serves Minocqua, Oneida county and surrounding communities with both scheduled commercial jet service and general aviation services.

Until the 1980s, a Milwaukee Road line went through the town. The line is now the Bear Skin State Trail.

== Images ==
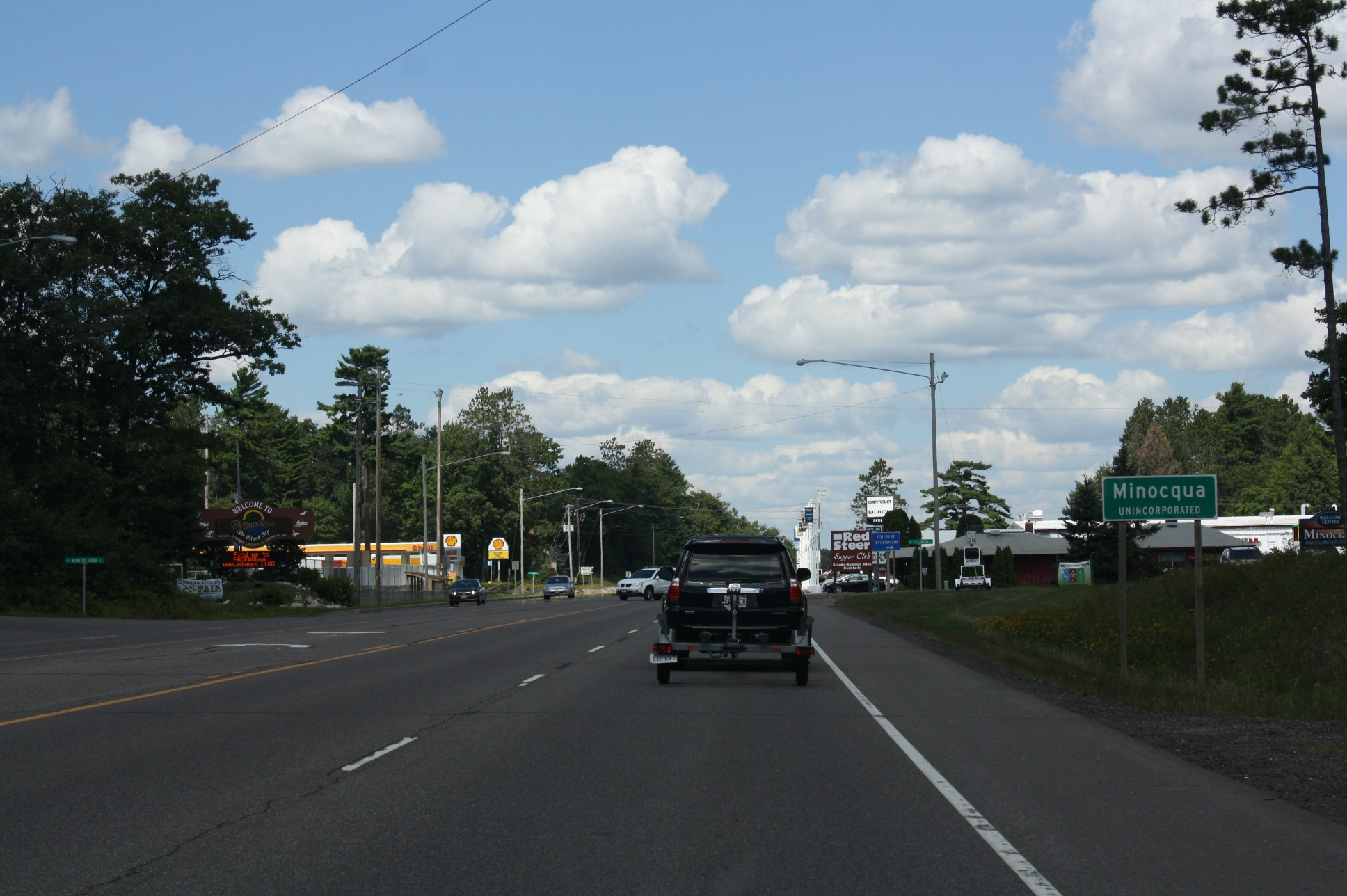
Minocqua sign

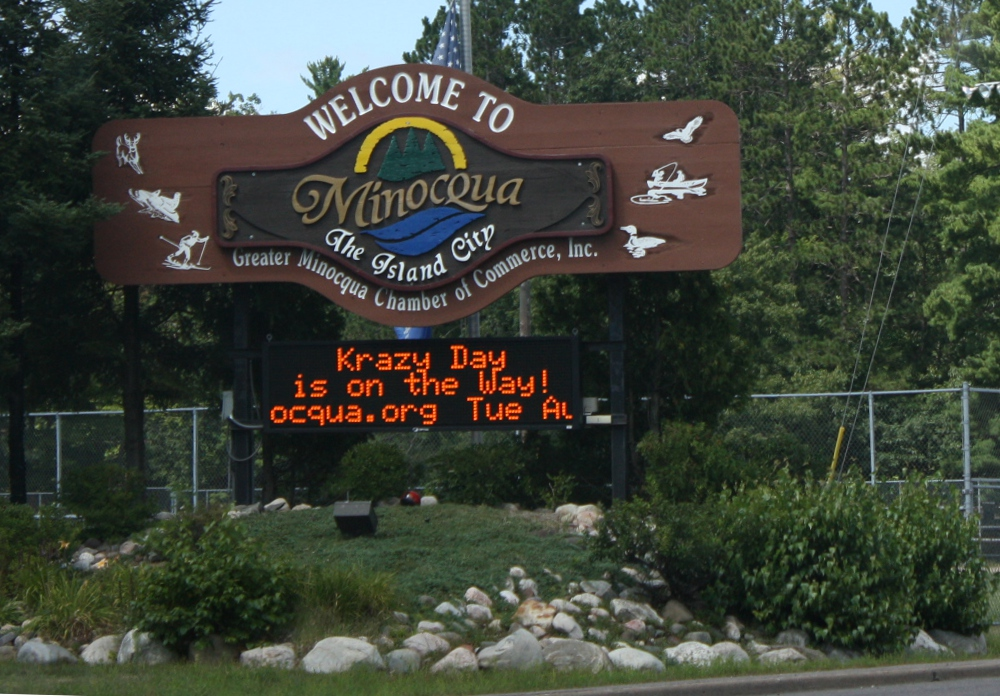
Welcome sign

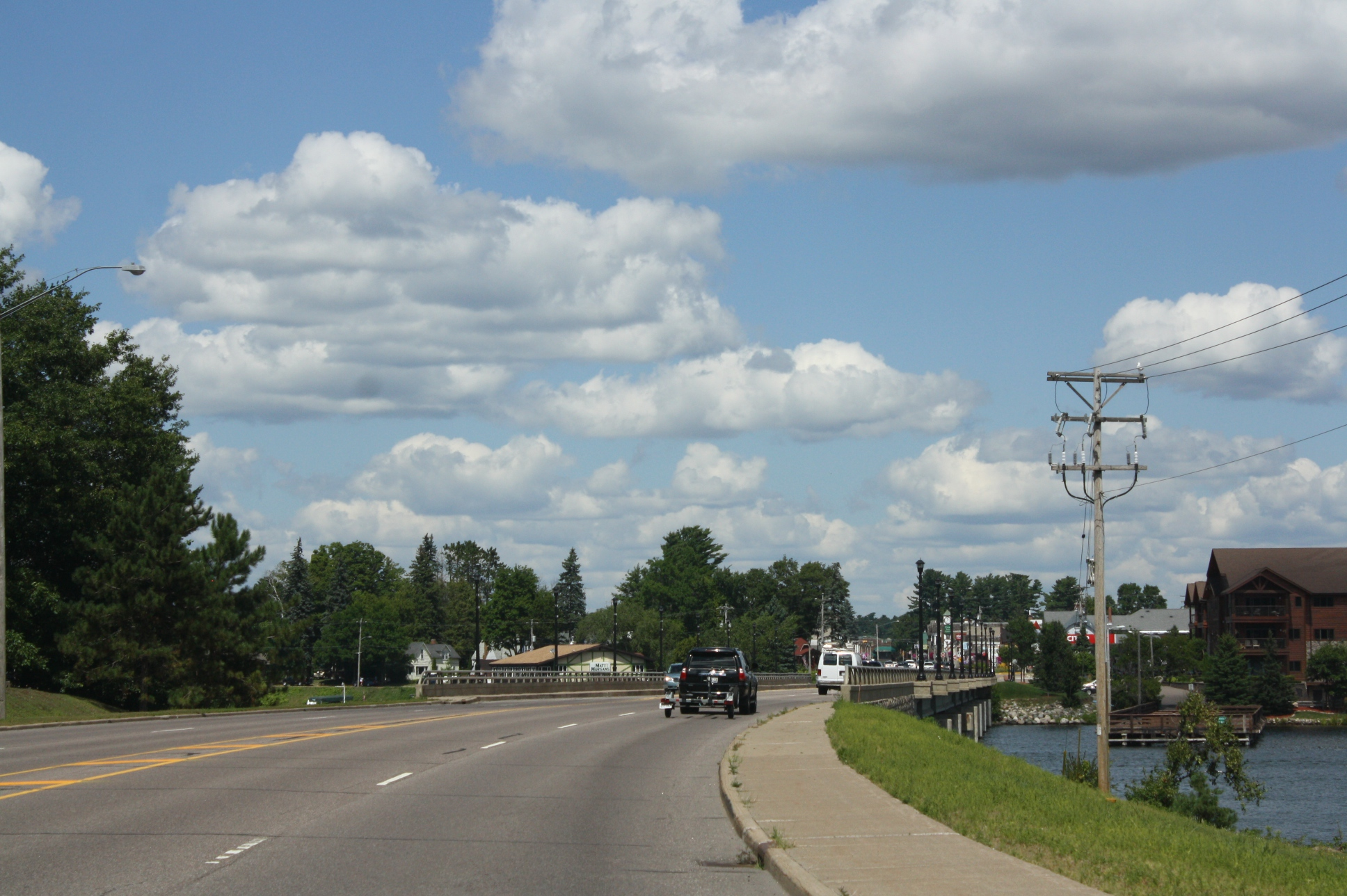
Bridge over Lake Minocqua in the Minocqua CDP

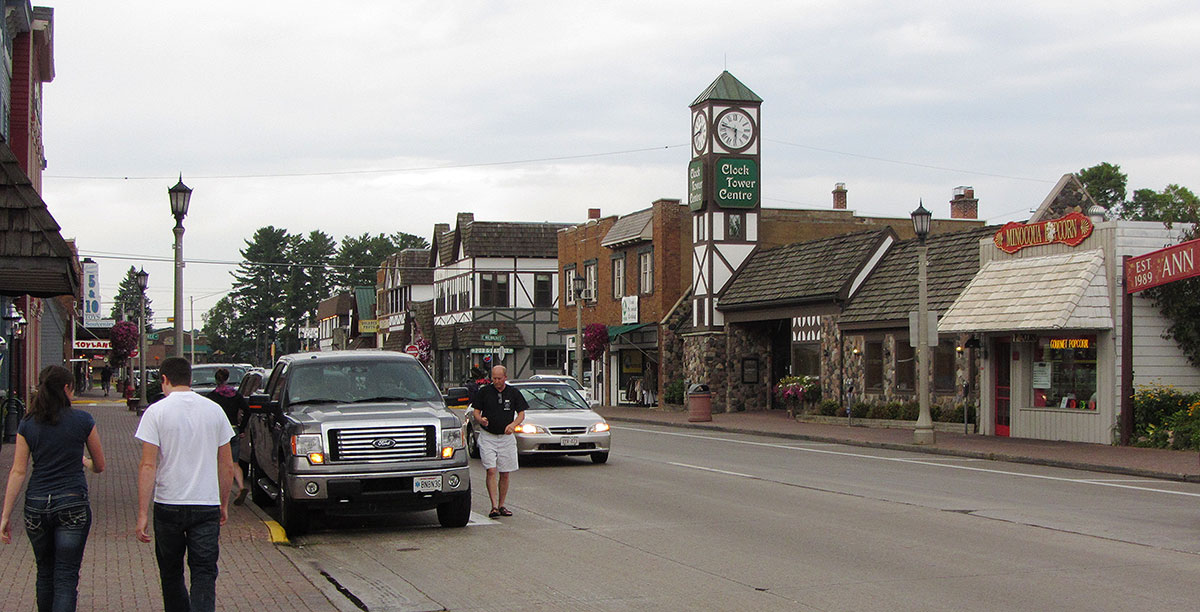
Downtown

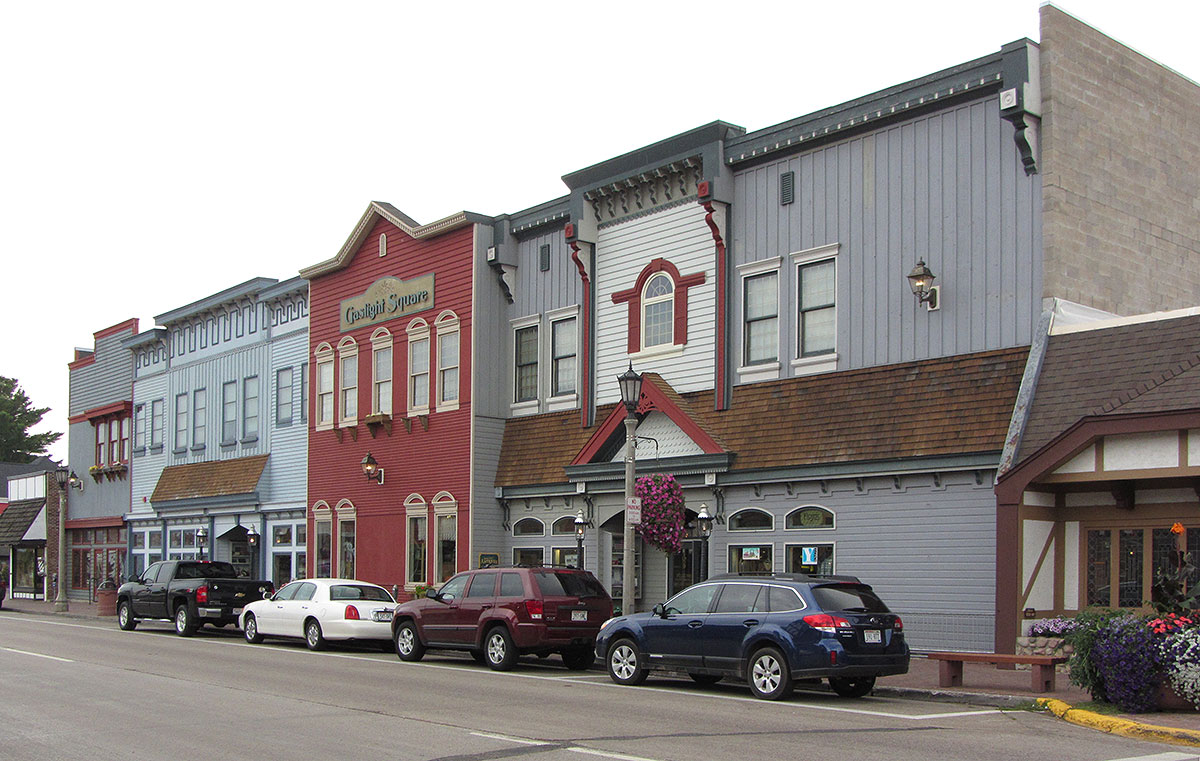
Downtown

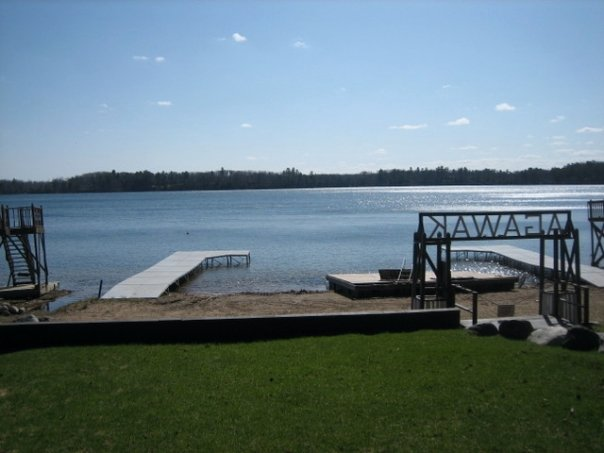
A view of Blue Lake from Camp Agawak

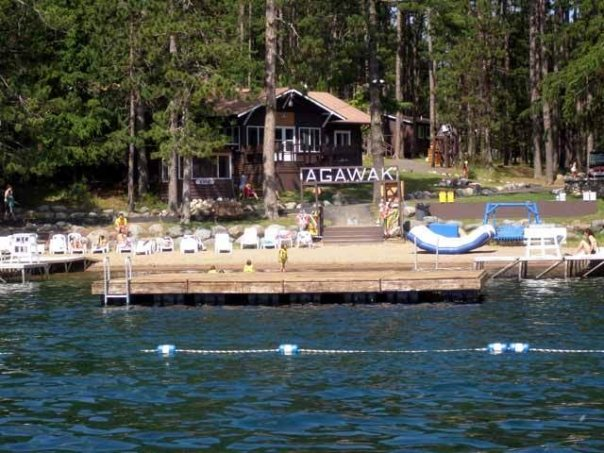
This is a view of Camp Agawak from the Waterfront

== Notable people ==
- Tom Tiffany – U.S. representative, former Wisconsin state senator and Wisconsin state assemblyman

== See also ==
- List of towns in Wisconsin
