= Minocqua (CDP), Wisconsin =

Census-designated place in Wisconsin, United States

Minocqua, Wisconsin
- Census-designated place
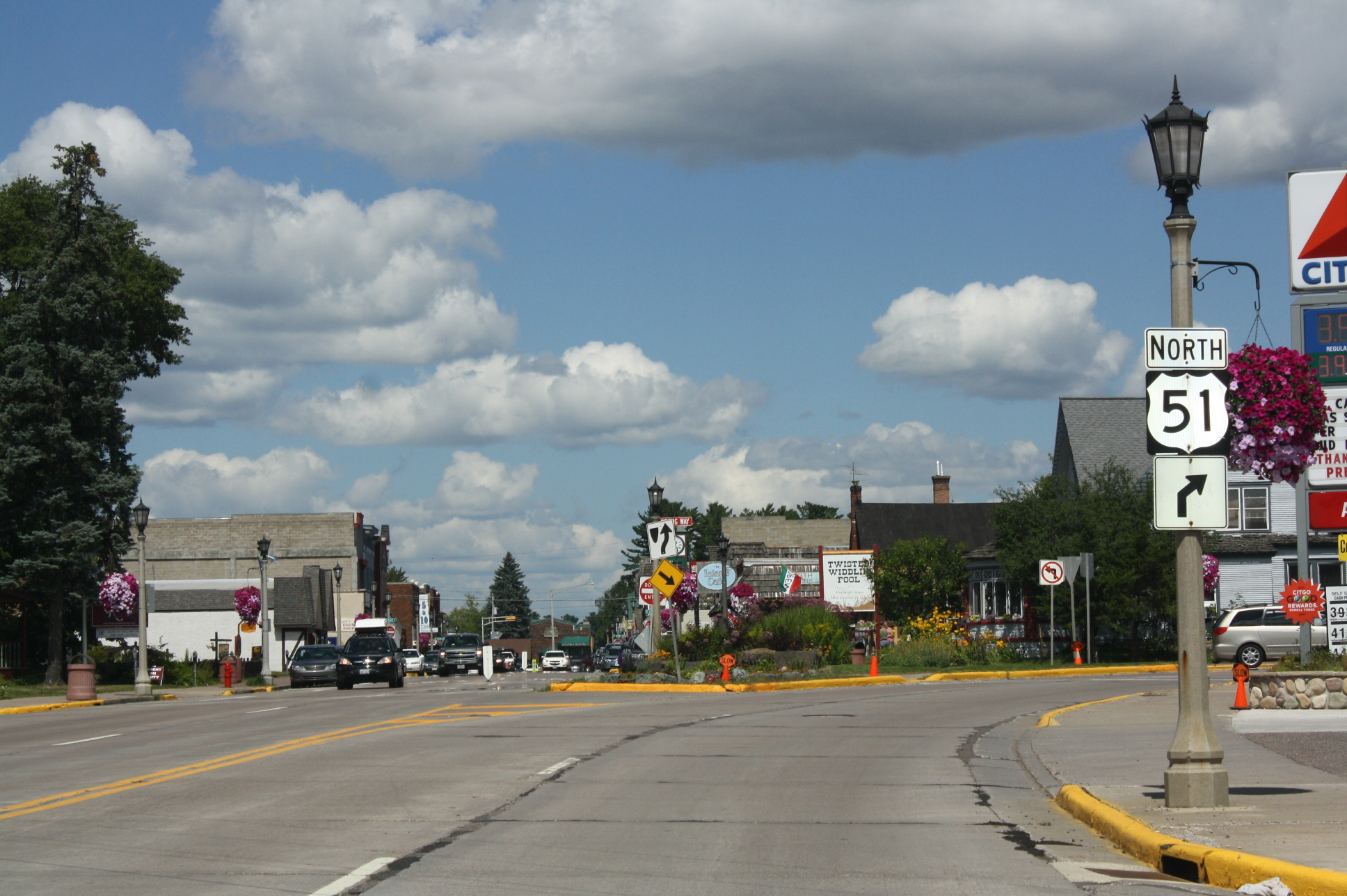
- Entering downtown Minocqua
- Nickname: The Island City
- Location within Wisconsin
- Coordinates: 45°52′17″N 89°42′40″W
- Country: United States
- State: Wisconsin
- County: Oneida

Area
  - Total: 0.703 sq mi (1.82 km^{2})
  - Land: 0.650 sq mi (1.68 km^{2})
  - Water: 0.053 sq mi (0.14 km^{2})
- Elevation: 1,608 ft (490 m)

Population (2020)
  - Total: 411
  - Density: 632/sq mi (244/km^{2})
- Time zone: UTC-6 (Central (CST))
  - Summer (DST): UTC-5 (CDT)
- ZIP code: 54548
- Area codes: 715 & 534
- GNIS ID: 1569580

Minocqua is a census-designated place located in the town of Minocqua, Oneida County, Wisconsin, United States. Minocqua is located on a peninsula on Minocqua Lake, 21.5 miles (34.6 km) northwest of Rhinelander. The community is served by U.S. Route 51. Minocqua has a post office with ZIP code 54548. As of the 2020 census, its population is 411, down from 451 at the 2010 census.

== Images ==
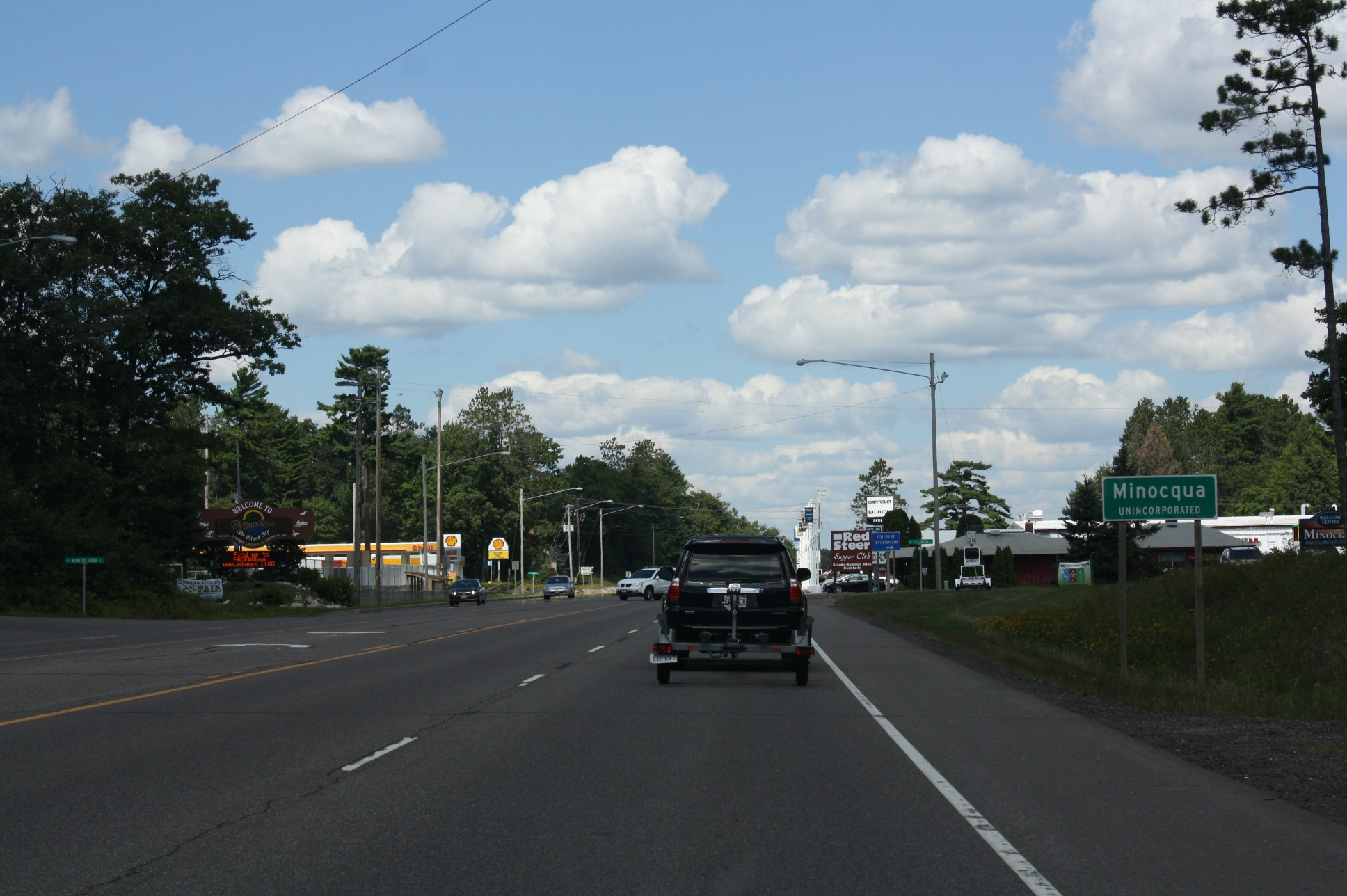
Minocqua sign

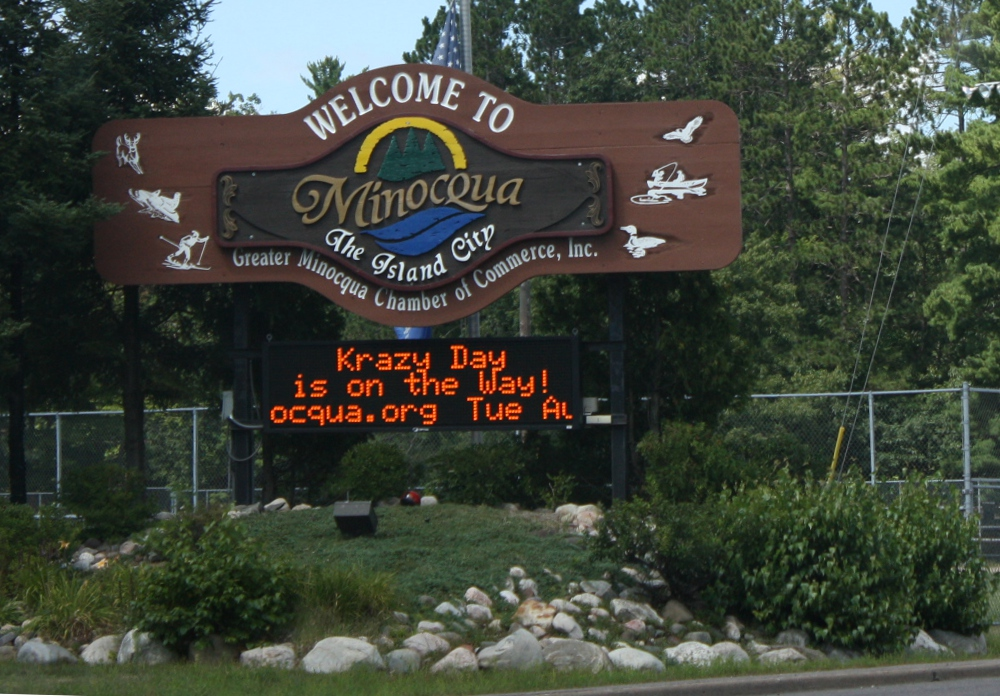
Welcome sign

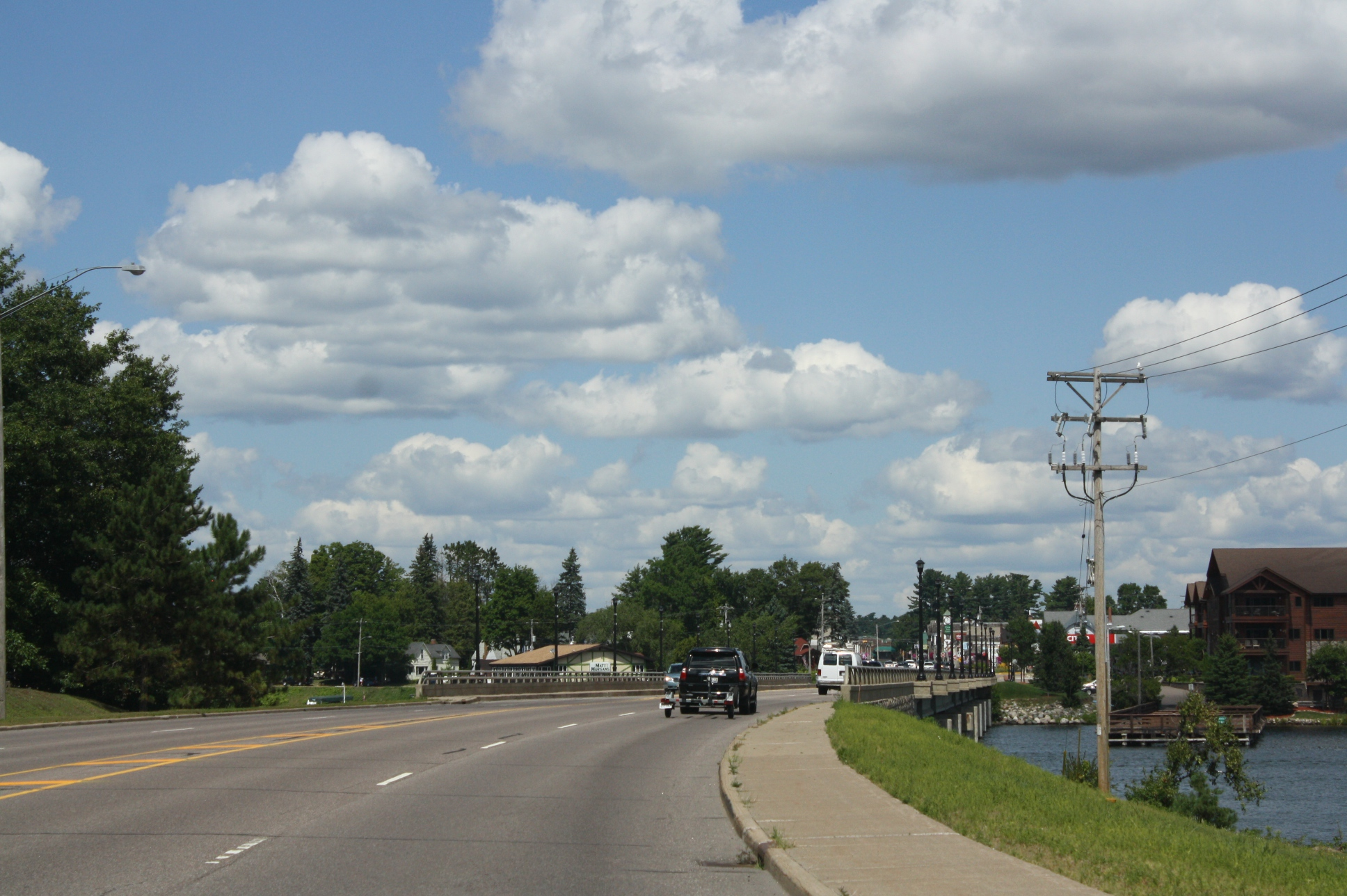
Bridge over Lake Minocqua in Minocqua
