= Powell Marsh Wildlife Area =

Protected area in northern Wisconsin, US

- IUCN category V (protected landscape/seascape)
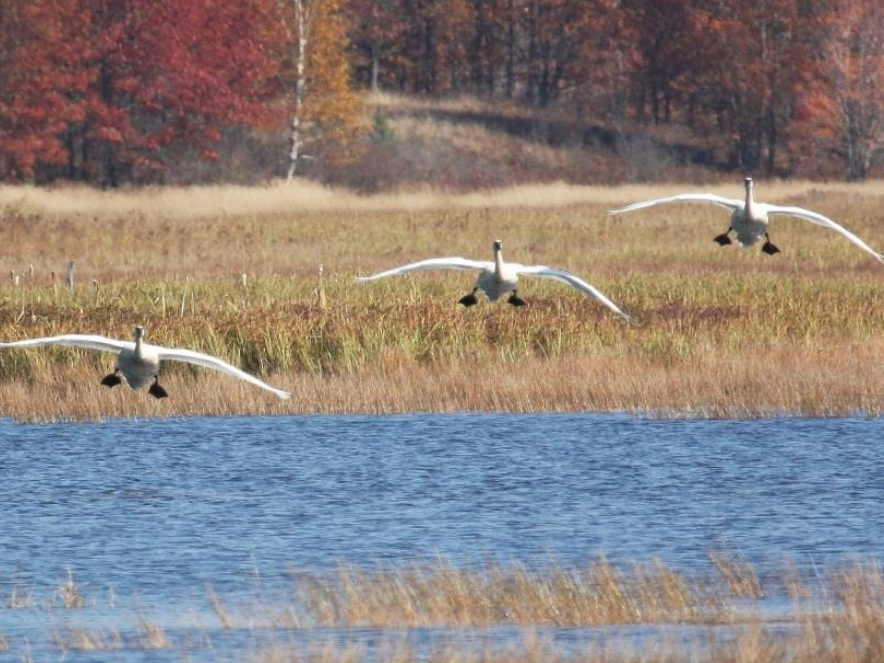
- Trumpeter swans landing on the Vista Flowage

- Location within Wisconsin Location within the United States
- Location: Vilas County and Iron County, Wisconsin
- Nearest city: Eagle River, WI
- Coordinates: 46°4′17″N 89°52′50″W
- Area: 4,850 acres (19.6 km^{2})
- Elevation: 1,604 ft (489 m)
- Established: 1955
- Governing body: Wisconsin Department of Natural Resources

The Powell Marsh Wildlife Area is a 4,850-acre (19.6 km^{2}) tract of protected land located in Vilas and Iron counties, Wisconsin, owned and partially managed by the Wisconsin Department of Natural Resources (WDNR). The nearby Dead Pike Lake has drawn attention to the wildlife area from conservators and homeowners nearby due to surface and groundwater flows shared between the two, with man-made structures in the latter harming the water quality of the lake.

== History ==
Farmsteads and a short railway track used to transport lumber were the first recorded instances of development within the current bounds of the wildlife area, which were present by the 1930s. The site was naturally prone to wildfires, which were responsible for helping new vegetation spring up from the peat, which in turn attracted geese to the area. Some fires were caused by railroad activity. These wildfires have not occurred since the 1940s, and modern management uses controlled fires. The potential for continued geese hunting led hunters and landowners to petition the Wisconsin Conservation Department (a precursor to the WDNR) to establish a protected habitat area to keep stocks of geese strong. In 1955, the Commissioner of Lands granted ownership of 3,125 acres within Manitowish Waters township land to the state of Wisconsin.

Early efforts to secure the integrity of the habitat resulted in the construction of various dikes and drainage ditches to allow for controlled burns to take place, which would create a more hospitable environment for geese. In 1957 a decoy flock of geese was placed in the wildlife area that was initially successful in attracting migrating flocks, yet with each passing year, the efficacy waned, until the decoy flock was removed in 1974. An investigation determined by the WDNR concluded that the dwindling flocks of geese could be attributed to a shift in migration patterns and the base inhospitableness of the marsh. The site benefits other fowl, as well as deer.

In 2013 planning for the master plan resumed after a 13-year hiatus due to the WDNR focusing its efforts on the master plan for the neighboring Northern Highland-American Legion State Forest. The current master plan for the wildlife area was approved and published in December 2016. The current management strategy centers on the manipulation of water levels to shift land cover to be more suitable for shorebirds and other waterfowl.

Much of the original and current funding comes from the Pittman–Robertson Federal Aid in Wildlife Restoration Act.

== Powell Marsh ==
The whole of the Powell Marsh Wildlife Area is classified further as a habitat management area, with the goal of providing a habitat for species that require wetland or aquatic areas. Within the confines of the Marsh, there are five separate lakes and seven flowages that are managed by the WDNR. The wildlife area is bordered by the Northern Highland-American Legion State Forest and Manitowish Chain O Lakes to the north, east, and west and the Lac du Flambeau Reservation to the south.

In addition to the 4,850 acres owned by the state, there are 390 acres (1.6 km^{2}) owned privately. There are five different types of cover in the wildlife area, including forested wetland, grassy upland islands, open water, upland forest fringe, and the most common, unforested wetland.

Cover type acreage
Cover type	Acres	Percentage cover
Forested wetland	1,284	28%
Grassy upland islands	62	1%
Open water	210	5%
Unforested wetlands	2,415	53%
Upland forest fringe	580	13%
Total acreage	4,551 (+390)	100%

== Ceded territory ==
The Powell Marsh Wildlife Area is within the boundaries of the ceded territory of the 1837 and 1842 treaties with the Chippewa. These two treaties dictated that the Ojibwe tribes in the area would cede lands in the north of Wisconsin to the United States Government. In return for ceding ownership of their native lands, they were granted access to hunt, fish, and gather within some public areas. The Powell Marsh Wildlife Area is one such area, used for hunting, fishing, and other tribal activities. It is subject to management by the Lac du Flambeau Band of Lake Superior Chippewa via an Integrated Resource Management Plan.

== Dead Pike Lake ==
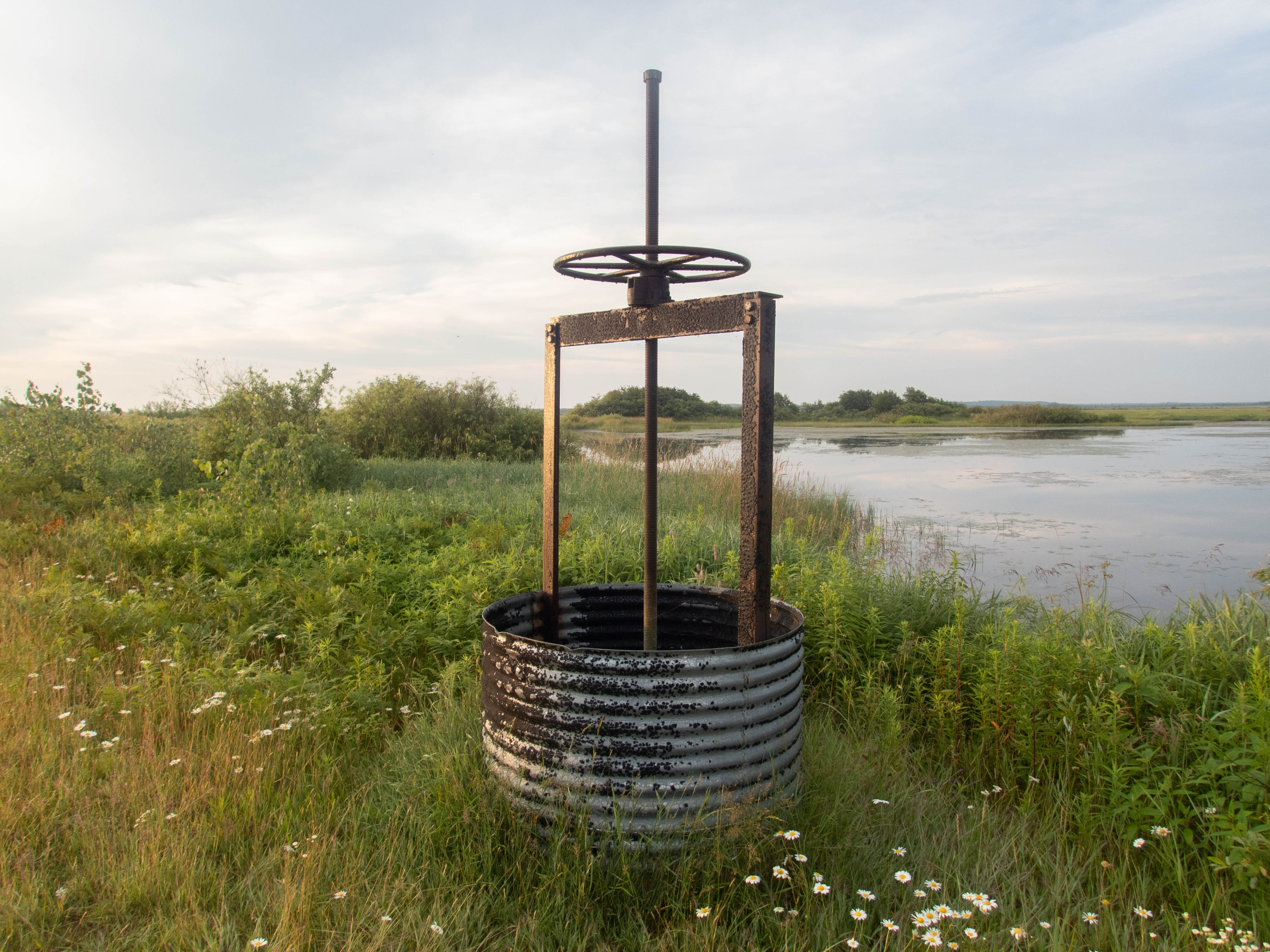
A water control structure in Powell Marsh

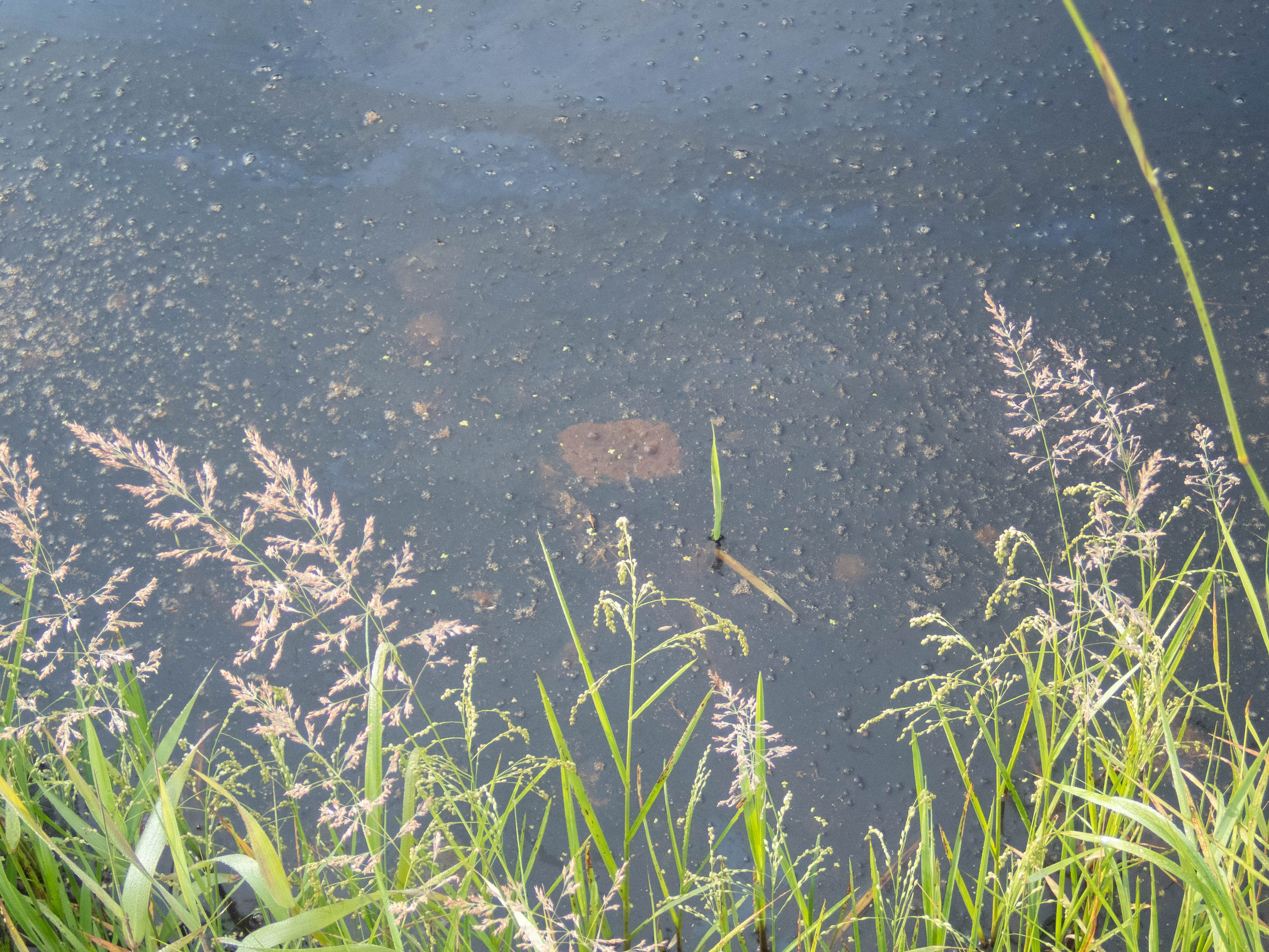
Iron floc in water at Vista Flowage

Dead Pike Lake is to the northwest and downstream of the Powell Marsh Wildlife Area, and the health and water quality of the lake are closely tied to man-made manipulations of the wildlife area. In the mid-1950s, the construction of water control structures and an extensive ditch and levee road system began in the wildlife area, which did restore much of the original marshland but also cut deep into the bog's semi-aquitard layer. This caused the groundwater and surface water, which feeds into Dead Pike Lake from Powell Marsh, to interact with each other. In addition to the iron-rich surface water that began to put increased pressure on groundwater in the area, the water control structures were built with material including taconite ore, which likely leaked more iron manganese into the water.

The groundwater in the area is rich in iron, which naturally precipitates when exposed to oxygen, providing nutrients to iron-oxidizing bacteria. When water flow is prevented, naturally in low flow period and artificially through water control systems, most incoming water is from the groudwater table, and excretions from the iron bacteria accumulate, creating visible plumes of iron floc. The iron floc in the lake has been shown to correlate with flow rates of groundwater in the 13-mile (21 km) long levee system. Not only is the iron floc visible in the lake, but it has turned the lake rusty-brown in some areas, and in others has turned the water slimy.

== Flora and fauna ==
The Powell Marsh Wildlife Area has five defined types of ground cover, and thus has multiple different species of trees. The most commonly observed trees in the wildlife area consist of aspen, white birch, red maple, red oak, white pine, black spruce, and tamarack. In addition to trees, there are various aquatic plants and shrubs, including willow and sphagnum moss.

In 2016, 205 different species of bird were observed in the wildlife area, including 34 species of birds that are labeled as either protected, threatened, endangered, or of special concern. The only species of bird labeled as endangered known to either nest or migrate in the wildlife area is the black tern, which while labeled as of least concern by the IUCN, is currently on the list of endangered birds in the state of Wisconsin. Other rare birds considered in danger found to be in the wildlife area include the LeConte's sparrow, Nelson's sparrow, and the threatened Yellow rail.

Other documented rare mammalian species observed in the wildlife area include the gray wolf (listed as of special concern), hoary bat (listed as of special concern), little brown bat (threatened), and the silver-haired bat (special concern). Rare species besides mammals include the American bullfrog, mink frog, wingless mountain grasshopper, bog copper butterfly, and the frigga fritillary butterfly.

The wildlife area is a habitat founded specifically for the preservation and hunting of ducks and other waterfowl and is also known for its stock of mink and muskrats.

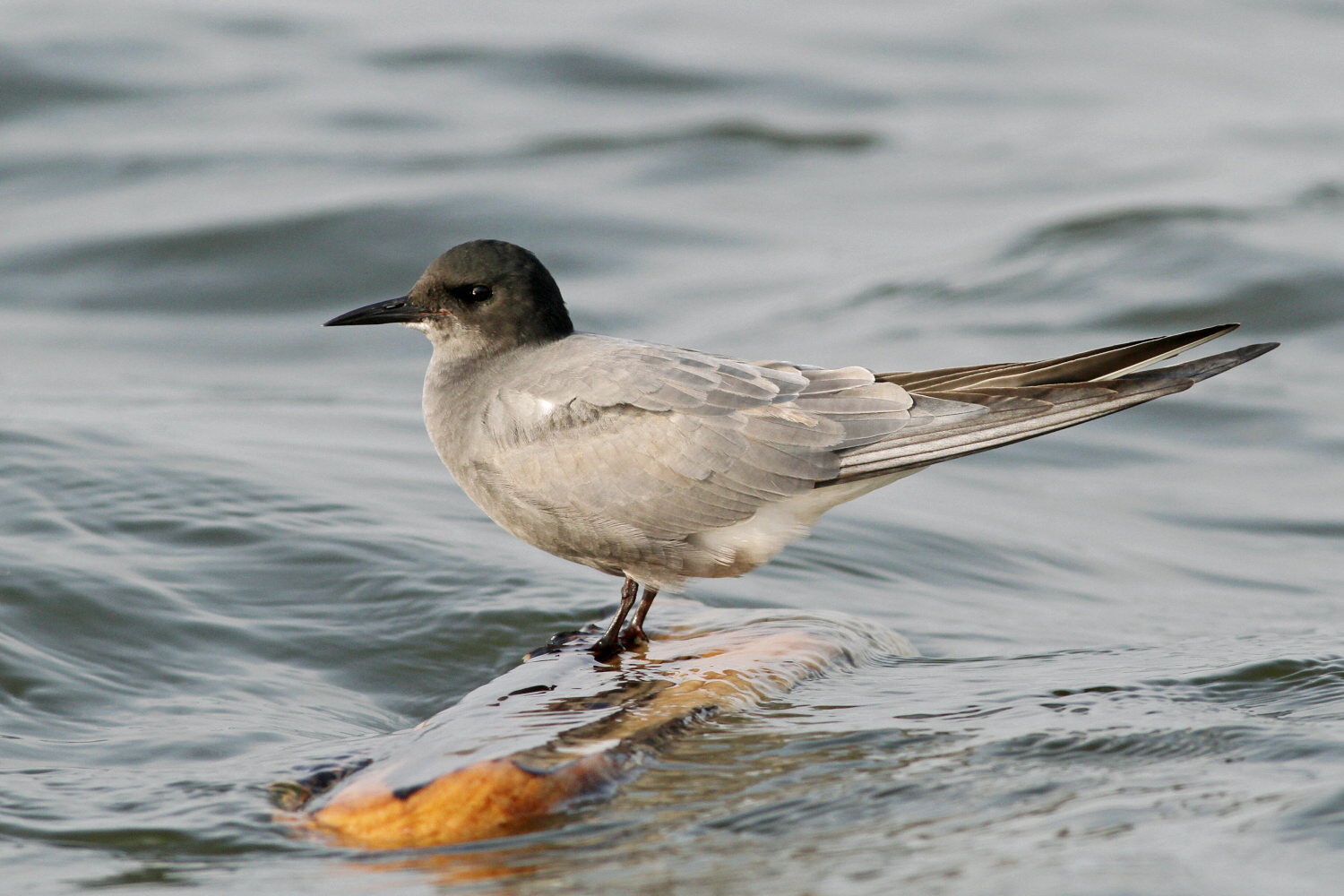
Black tern

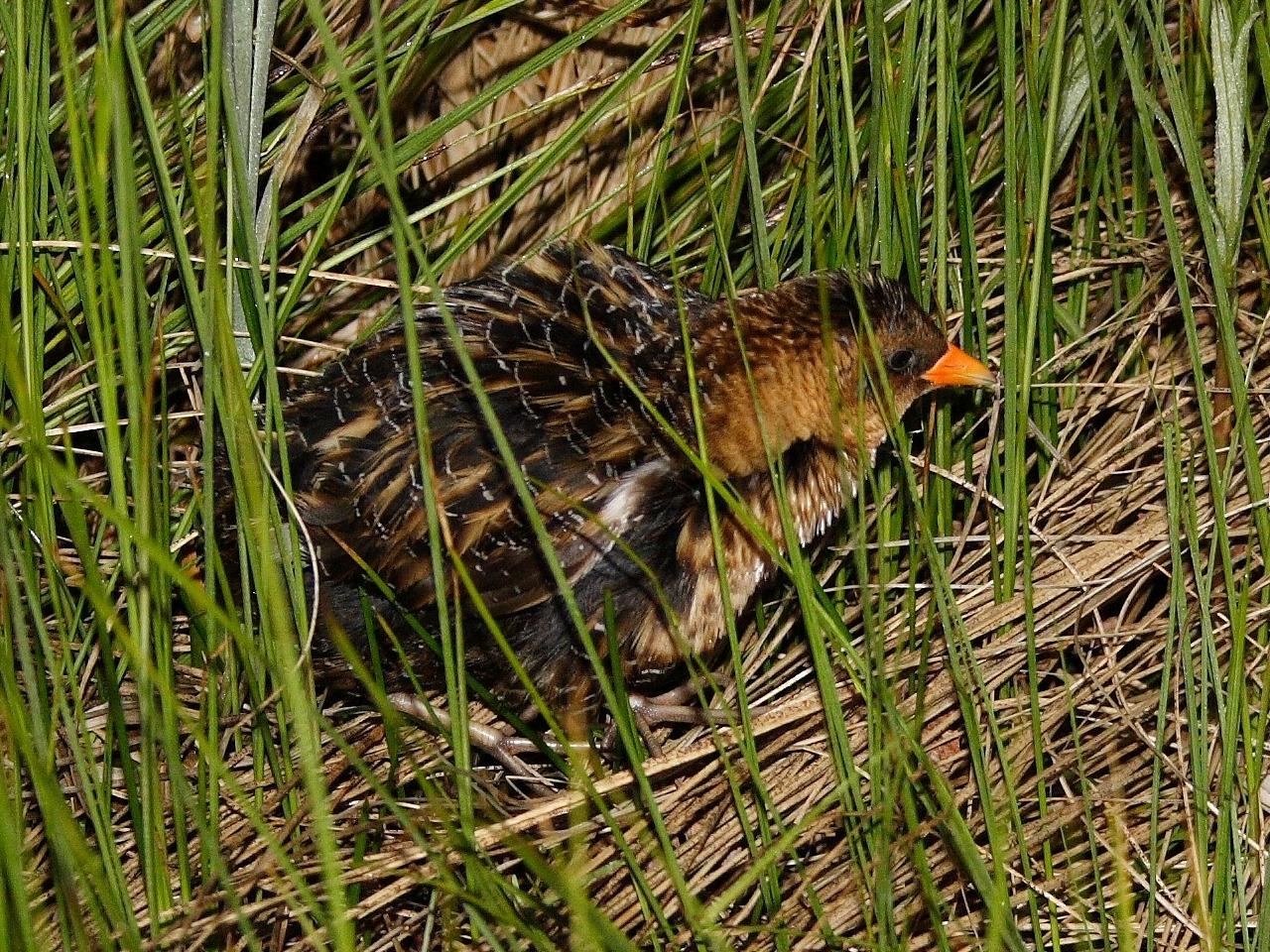
Yellow rail

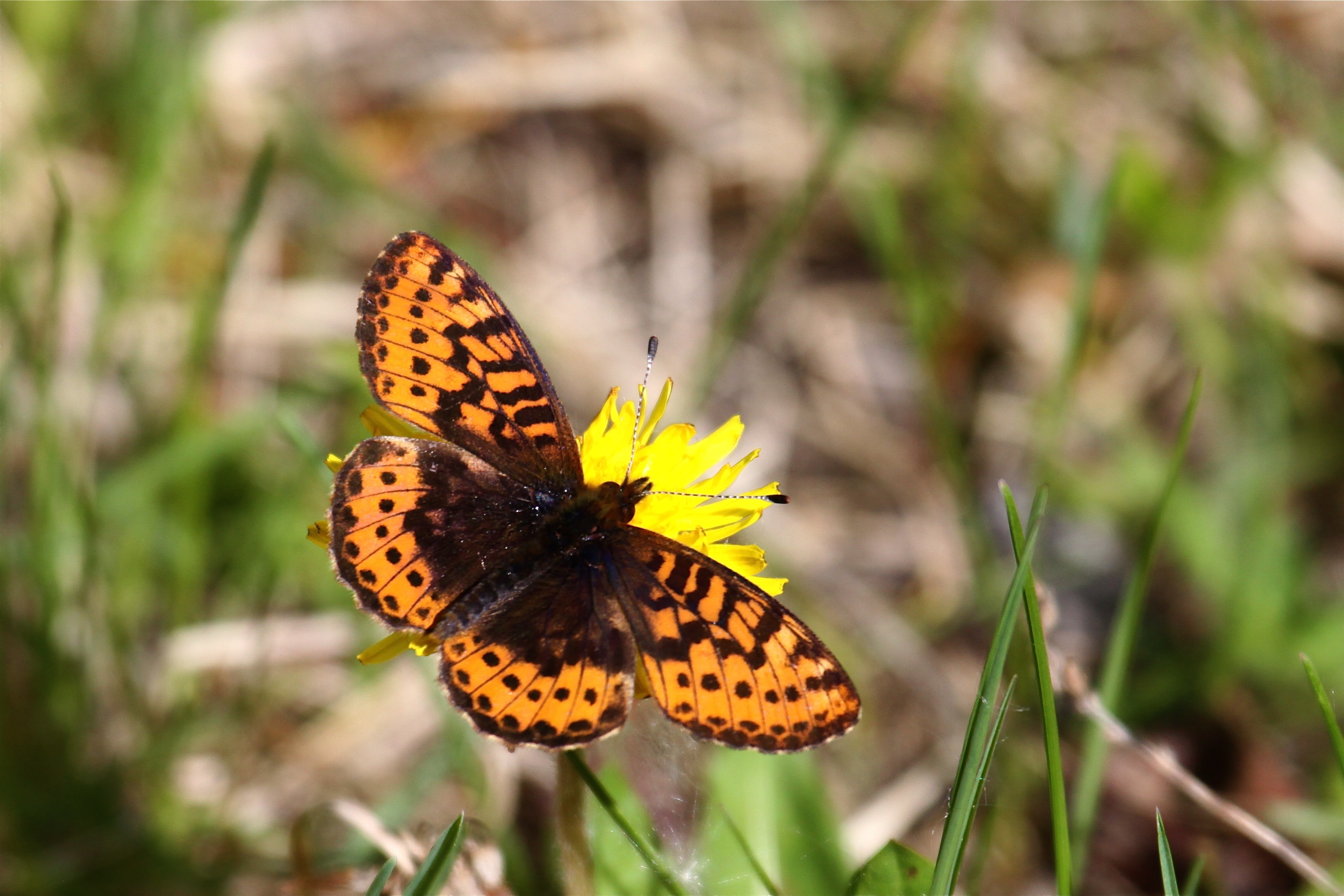
Frigga fritillary butterfly

== Recreation ==
Hunting, fishing, and trapping are allowed in the wildlife area, although other recreational activities such as camping and hiking are limited by poor soil quality. Viewing sites in the area are easily accessible by main roads in the general area, and the Marsh is a popular spot for birdwatchers. Fishing is available in both Dead Pike Lake and Sherman lake, both of which are attached to the wildlife area and subject to catch limitations set by the WDNR, with the focus of such limits being set around the catching of walleye, also called the yellow pike or yellow pickerel, despite it not having any relation to the pickerel family.

There is one managed trail in the wildlife area, the 8.5-mile (13.7 km) Powell Marsh Ski Trail. The Ski Trail is managed by the Northern Highland-American Legion State Forest and is available for hiking in non-winter months. There are two other trails in the wildlife area that are under construction; the Regional Bike Trail and the Vista Flowage Loop.

== See also ==
- Chemistry of wetland dredging
