= D25 =

D25 may refer to:

== Vehicles ==
=== Aircraft ===
- Dewoitine D.25, a French fighter
- New Standard D-25, an American biplane

=== Ships ===
- ARA Seguí (D-25), an Allen M. Sumner-class destroyer of the Argentine Navy
- Brazilian destroyer Marcilio Dias (D25), a Gearing-class destroyer of the Brazilian Navy
- HMS Warwick (D25), a W-class destroyer of the Royal Navy
- Spanish destroyer Jorge Juan (D25), a Fletcher-class destroyer of the Spanish Navy

=== Rail transport ===
- LNER Class D25, a class of British steam locomotive

== Other uses ==
- D-25 (rocket engine), a Soviet liquid rocket engine
- D-25 gun, a Soviet field gun
- D25 road (Croatia)
- DB-25, an electrical connector
- Soloviev D-25, a Soviet turboshaft helicopter engine
- Manitowish Waters Airport, in Vilas County, Wisconsin
