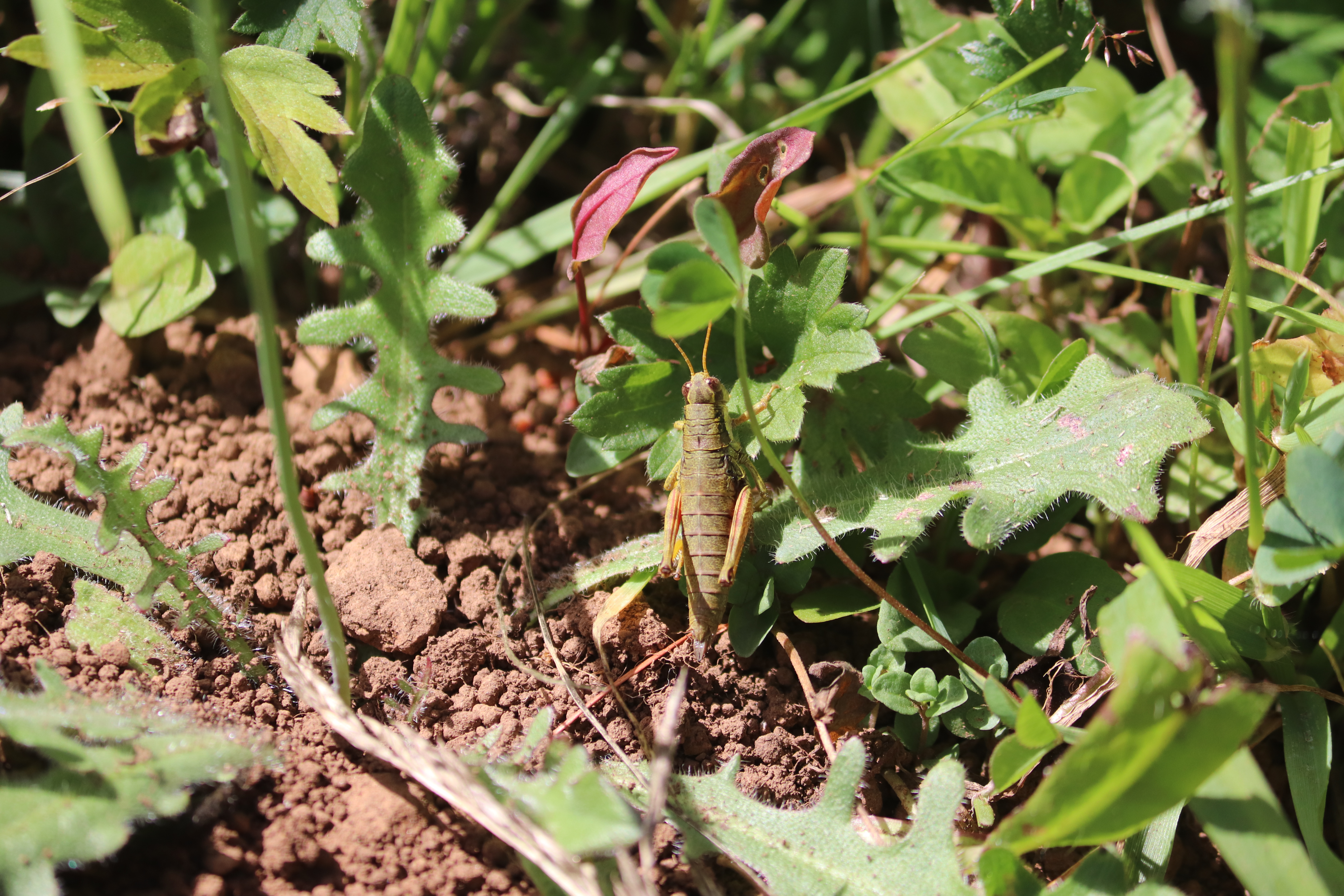
- Booneacris alticola

Scientific classification
- Kingdom: Animalia
- Phylum: Arthropoda
- Clade: Pancrustacea
- Class: Insecta
- Order: Orthoptera
- Suborder: Caelifera
- Family: Acrididae
- Subfamily: Melanoplinae
- Tribe: Podismini
- Genus: Booneacris; Rehn & Randell, 1962

= Booneacris =

Genus of grasshoppers

Booneacris is a genus of spur-throated grasshoppers in the family Acrididae. There are at least four described species in Booneacris.

== Species ==
These four species belong to the genus Booneacris:

- Booneacris alticola Rehn & Randell, 1962^{i c g b} (Marys peak wingless grasshopper)
- Booneacris glacialis (Scudder, 1863)^{i c g b} (wingless mountain grasshopper)
- Booneacris polita (Scudder, 1898)^{i c g b} (Willamette wingless grasshopper)
- Booneacris variegata (Scudder, 1897)^{i c g}

Data sources: i = ITIS, c = Catalogue of Life, g = GBIF, b = Bugguide.net
