= Manitowish Waters (community), Wisconsin =

Manitowish Waters, Wisconsin
- Unincorporated community
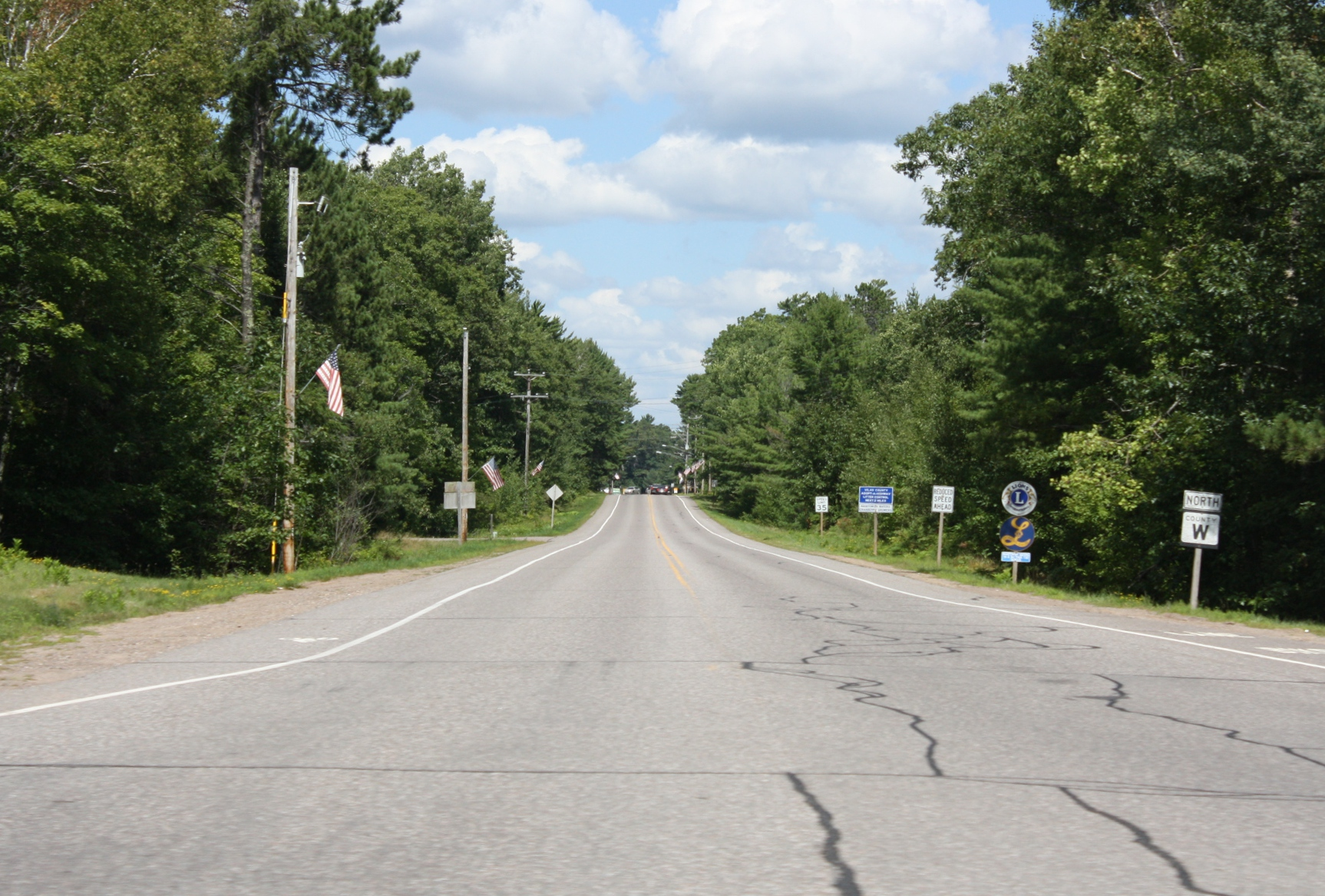
- Looking north at the community of Manitowish Waters on County Road W

- Location within Wisconsin Location within the United States
- Coordinates: 46°08′06″N 89°53′16″W
- Country: United States
- State: Wisconsin
- County: Vilas
- Elevation: 1,621 ft (494 m)
- Time zone: UTC-6 (Central (CST))
  - Summer (DST): UTC-5 (CDT)
- ZIP code: 54545
- Area codes: 715 & 534
- GNIS feature ID: 1568940

Manitowish Waters is an unincorporated community located in the town of Manitowish Waters in Vilas County, Wisconsin, United States. Manitowish Waters is located near U.S. Route 51, 11.5 miles (18.5 km) north of Lac du Flambeau. It has a post office with ZIP code 54545.
