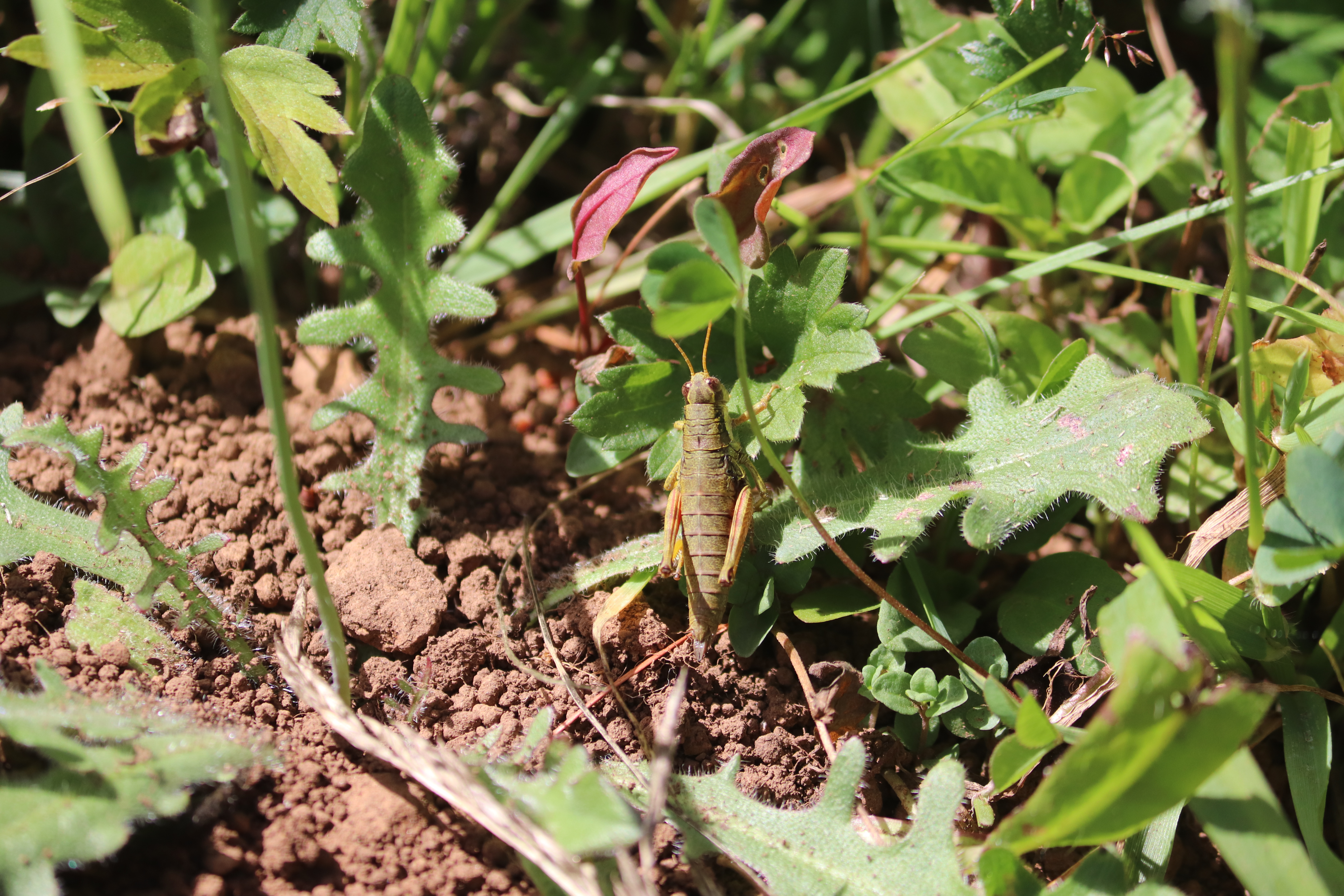

Scientific classification
- Kingdom: Animalia
- Phylum: Arthropoda
- Clade: Pancrustacea
- Class: Insecta
- Order: Orthoptera
- Suborder: Caelifera
- Family: Acrididae
- Subfamily: Melanoplinae
- Tribe: Podismini
- Genus: Booneacris
- Species: B. alticola

Binomial name
- Booneacris alticola Rehn & Randell, 1962

= Booneacris alticola =

Species of grasshopper

Booneacris alticola, the Marys peak wingless grasshopper, is a species of spur-throated grasshopper in the family Acrididae. It is found in North America.
