= Manitowish Chain O Lakes =

Chain of lakes in the state of Wisconsin, United States

Coordinates: 46°6′59″N 89°51′1″W

The Manitowish Chain O Lakes is a chain of lakes consisting of 10 lakes shown below. The chain is located in Manitowish Waters in Vilas County, Wisconsin, United States. The chain is known for its fishing. Little Star Lake is home to Little Bohemia Lodge where John Dillinger had his famous shootout. Also the movie Public Enemies was filmed there.

Lake	Area
Rest Lake	809 acres (327 ha)
Stone Lake	139 acres (56 ha)
Fawn Lake	74 acres (30 ha)
Clear Lake	555 acres (225 ha)
Spider Lake	272 acres (110 ha)
Island Lake	1,023 acres (414 ha)
Manitowish Lake	496 acres (201 ha)
Little Star Lake	245 acres (99 ha)
Wild Rice Lake	379 acres (153 ha)
Alder Lake	274 acres (111 ha)

The lakes are fed by the Manitowish River, which drains into the Chippewa River basin and ultimately the Upper Mississippi River.
