= Manitowish Waters Airport =

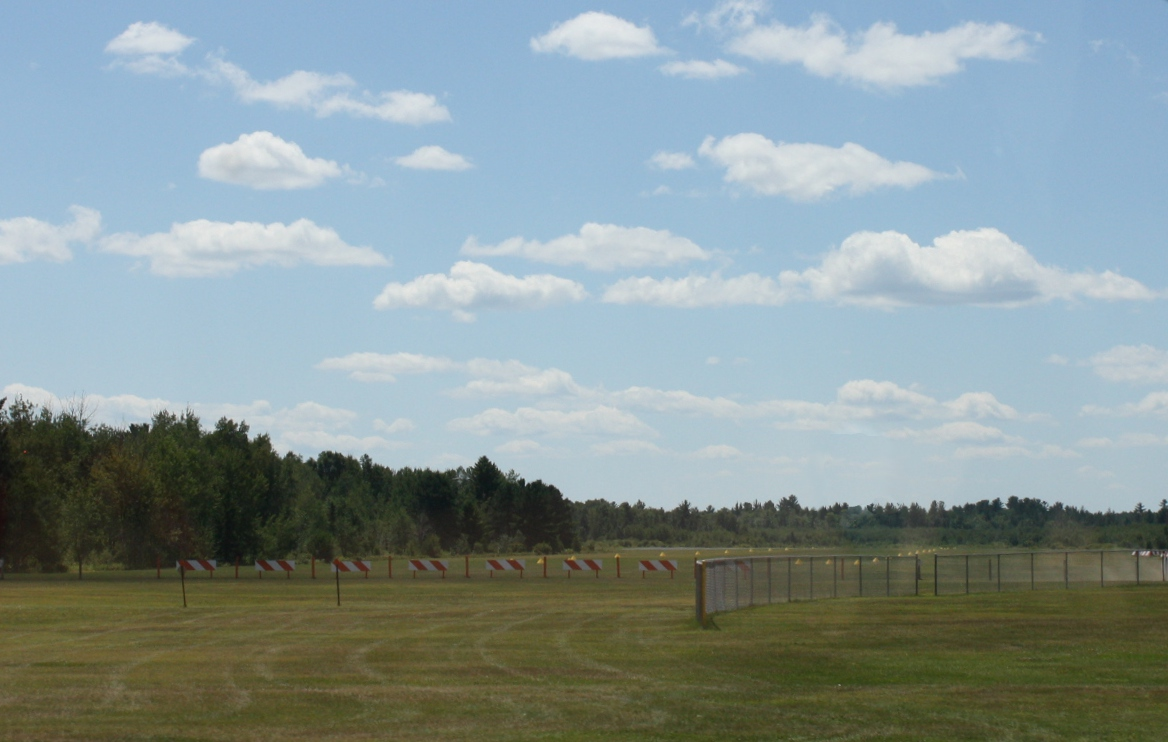
- IATA: none; ICAO: none; FAA LID: D25

Summary
- Airport type: Public
- Owner: Town of Manitowish Waters
- Serves: Manitowish Waters, Wisconsin
- Opened: October 1945
- Time zone: CST (UTC−06:00)
  - Summer (DST): CDT (UTC−05:00)
- Elevation AMSL: 1,610 ft / 491 m
- Coordinates: 46°07′13″N 089°52′56″W

Map
- Location of airport in Wisconsin D25 (the United States)

Runways
Direction	Length		Surface
Direction	ft	m	Surface
14/32	3,498	1,066	Asphalt
4/22	3,094	943	Turf

Statistics
- Aircraft operations (2021): 6,200
- Based aircraft (2024): 19
- Source: Federal Aviation Administration

Manitowish Waters Airport (FAA LID: D25) is a town owned public use airport located one mile (1.6 km) south of the central business district of Manitowish Waters, a town in Vilas County, Wisconsin, United States. It is included in the National Plan of Integrated Airport Systems for 2025–2029, which categorized it as a local general aviation facility.

Although most U.S. airports use the same three-letter location identifier for the FAA and IATA, this airport is assigned D25 by the FAA but has no designation from the IATA.

== Facilities and aircraft ==
Manitowish Waters Airport covers an area of 439 acres (177 ha) at an elevation of 1,610 feet (491 m) above mean sea level. It has two runways: 14/32 is 3,498 by 60 feet (1,066 x 18 m) with an asphalt surface and 4/22 is 3,094 by 120 feet (943 x 36 m) with a turf surface.

For the 12-month period ending August 12, 2021, the airport had 6,200 aircraft operations, an average of 17 per day: 97% general aviation and 3% air taxi. In July 2024, there were 19 aircraft based at this airport: all 19 single-engine.

== See also ==
- List of airports in Wisconsin
