= Manitowish Waters, Wisconsin =

- Town
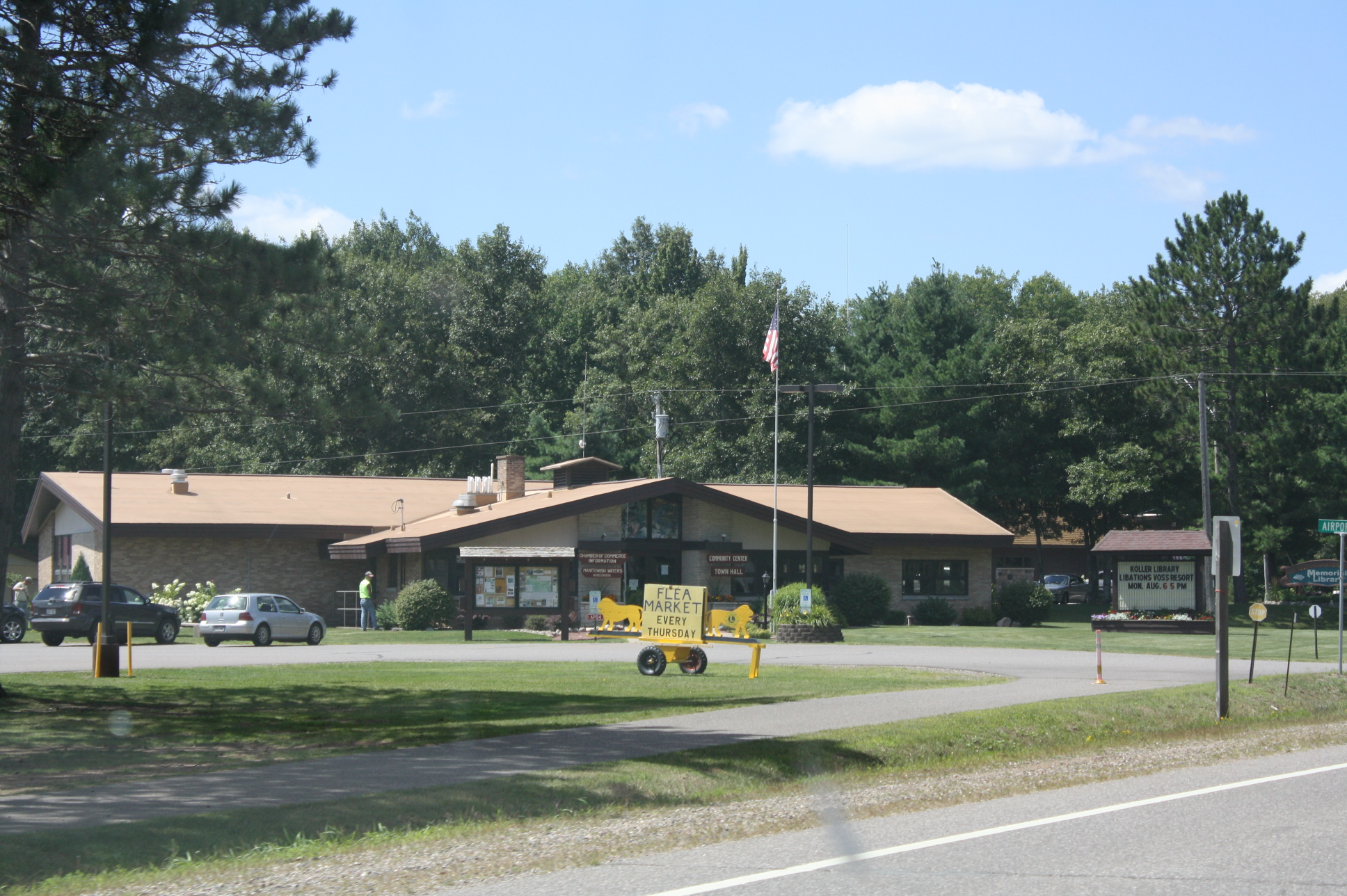
- Town hall and community center

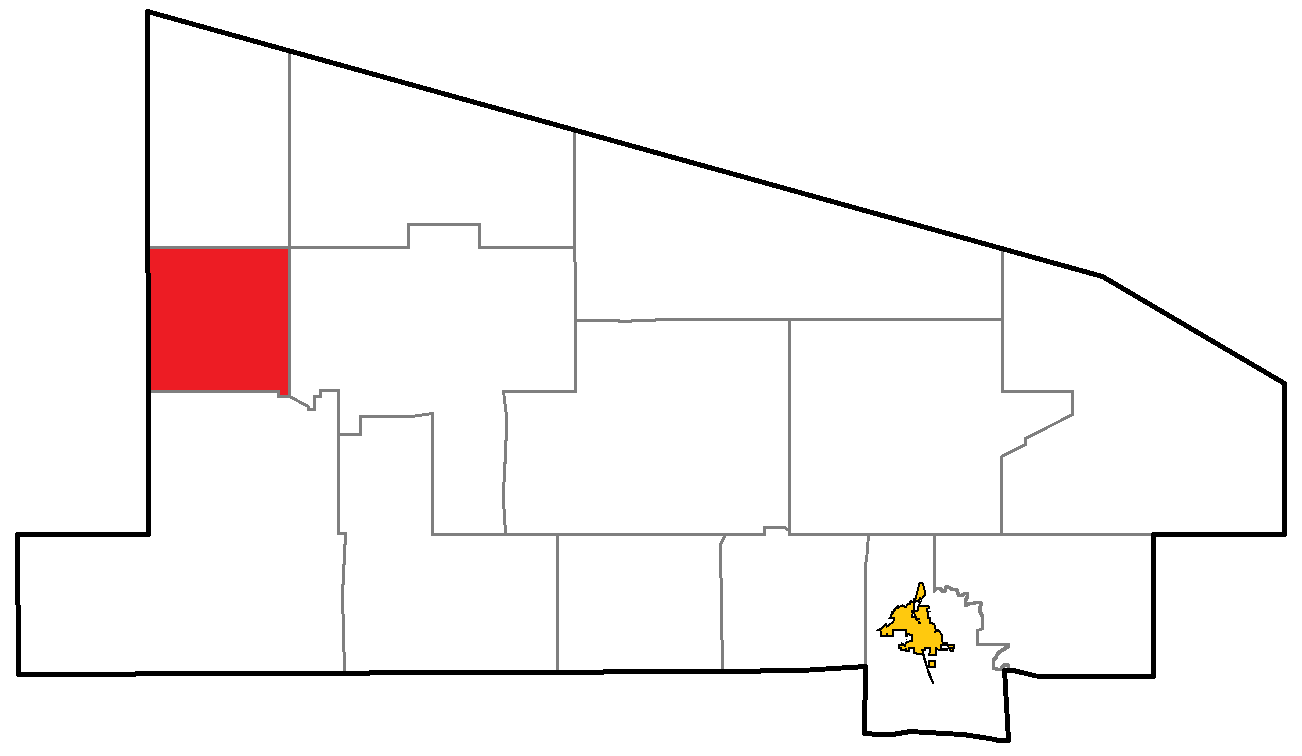
- Location of Manitowish Waters, within Vilas County

- Location within Wisconsin Manitowish Waters (the United States)
- Coordinates: 46°6′59″N 89°51′1″W
- Country: United States
- State: Wisconsin
- County: Vilas

Government
  - Chairman: John Hanson
  - Town Clerk: Dana Hilbert

Area
  - Total: 36.4 sq mi (94.4 km^{2})
  - Land: 30.3 sq mi (78.6 km^{2})
  - Water: 6.1 sq mi (15.7 km^{2})
- Elevation: 1,611 ft (491 m)

Population (2020)
  - Total: 624
  - Density: 20.6/sq mi (7.94/km^{2})
- Time zone: UTC-6 (Central (CST))
  - Summer (DST): UTC-5 (CDT)
- Area codes: 715 & 534
- FIPS code: 55-48462
- GNIS feature ID: 1583635
- Website: https://mwtown.gov/

Manitowish Waters is a town in Vilas County, Wisconsin, United States. The population was 624 in the 2020 census. The unincorporated community Manitowish Waters, is also located within the town.

== History ==
In 1934, at the Little Bohemia Lodge on Little Star Lake, the FBI and Dillinger Gang were involved in a shootout, which resulted in the accidental shooting death of one local Civilian Conservation Corps worker and severely injuring two other workers by federal agents who mistook them for members of the gang. Agent W. Carter Baum was also shot and killed by Baby Face Nelson in a brief gunfight a short distance away, which resulted in another special agent and a local constable being wounded. All six members of the gang escaped the incident unharmed.

The lodge, then owned by Emil Wanatka, remains in existence as a restaurant today without lodging. Bullet holes in the building's siding and windows from the shootout are still visible. Personal items left behind by the hasty departure of the Dillinger Gang members have been preserved and are on display. In the summer of 2008, the Little Bohemia Lodge was used in the filming of a re-creation of these events in the 2009 Michael Mann film Public Enemies, a movie about Dillinger and the FBI starring Johnny Depp as John Dillinger and Christian Bale as Melvin Purvis.

American businesspeople and political donors Richard and Elizabeth Uihlein are currently considered the "main benefactors" of Manitowish Waters, owning a hotel, a condominium complex, a lakefront pavilion, a restaurant, a spa, a coffee shop, and two gift shops in the city, as well as numerous private residences. This is controversial among permanent residents of the town, as even though the Uihleins have invested more than 6.5 million dollars in the town between 2007 and 2015, the residents complain that they are "left in the dark" about Uihlein projects and that the Uihleins exert unfair influence over long-standing local businesses.

== Geography ==
According to the United States Census Bureau, the town has a total area of 36.4 square miles (94.4 km^{2}), of which 30.4 square miles (78.6 km^{2}) is land and 6.1 square miles (15.7 km^{2}) (16.69%) is water.

=== Airport ===
Manitowish Waters is served by the Manitowish Waters Airport (D25). Located one mile south of the city, the airport handles approximately 6,200 operations per year, with roughly 96% general aviation and 4% air taxi.

=== Climate ===
Rest Lake is a weather station in Manitowish Waters near the Manitowish Waters Airport. Rest Lake has a humid continental climate (Köppen Dfb), bordering on a dry-winter humid continental climate (Köppen Dwb).

Climate data for Rest Lake, Wisconsin, 1991–2020 normals, 1913-2023 extremes: 1612ft (491m)
Month	Jan	Feb	Mar	Apr	May	Jun	Jul	Aug	Sep	Oct	Nov	Dec	Year
Record high °F (°C)	57 (14)	58 (14)	80 (27)	90 (32)	94 (34)	98 (37)	102 (39)	103 (39)	96 (36)	87 (31)	71 (22)	58 (14)	103 (39)
Mean maximum °F (°C)	39.1 (3.9)	44.8 (7.1)	58.2 (14.6)	76.1 (24.5)	82.3 (27.9)	86.9 (30.5)	88.4 (31.3)	87.2 (30.7)	82.6 (28.1)	73.7 (23.2)	55.7 (13.2)	40.4 (4.7)	90.6 (32.6)
Mean daily maximum °F (°C)	20.0 (−6.7)	25.2 (−3.8)	36.9 (2.7)	50.4 (10.2)	64.7 (18.2)	73.7 (23.2)	77.5 (25.3)	75.6 (24.2)	67.1 (19.5)	53.1 (11.7)	37.1 (2.8)	24.8 (−4.0)	50.5 (10.3)
Daily mean °F (°C)	10.2 (−12.1)	14.0 (−10.0)	25.2 (−3.8)	38.9 (3.8)	52.8 (11.6)	62.1 (16.7)	65.9 (18.8)	64.1 (17.8)	56.1 (13.4)	43.1 (6.2)	29.3 (−1.5)	16.8 (−8.4)	39.9 (4.4)
Mean daily minimum °F (°C)	0.4 (−17.6)	2.9 (−16.2)	13.5 (−10.3)	27.4 (−2.6)	40.9 (4.9)	50.5 (10.3)	54.4 (12.4)	52.6 (11.4)	45.1 (7.3)	33.1 (0.6)	21.5 (−5.8)	8.7 (−12.9)	29.3 (−1.5)
Mean minimum °F (°C)	−25.2 (−31.8)	−23.6 (−30.9)	−15.0 (−26.1)	9.1 (−12.7)	24.6 (−4.1)	34.2 (1.2)	40.5 (4.7)	37.9 (3.3)	27.5 (−2.5)	18.5 (−7.5)	1.3 (−17.1)	−18.7 (−28.2)	−29.3 (−34.1)
Record low °F (°C)	−50 (−46)	−51 (−46)	−39 (−39)	−17 (−27)	16 (−9)	25 (−4)	30 (−1)	30 (−1)	16 (−9)	−6 (−21)	−21 (−29)	−41 (−41)	−51 (−46)
Average precipitation inches (mm)	1.21 (31)	0.93 (24)	1.50 (38)	2.54 (65)	3.69 (94)	4.38 (111)	4.13 (105)	3.30 (84)	3.66 (93)	3.57 (91)	1.93 (49)	1.42 (36)	32.26 (821)
Average snowfall inches (cm)	16.70 (42.4)	12.70 (32.3)	10.90 (27.7)	7.20 (18.3)	0.30 (0.76)	0.00 (0.00)	0.00 (0.00)	0.00 (0.00)	0.10 (0.25)	2.90 (7.4)	9.10 (23.1)	15.30 (38.9)	75.2 (191.11)
Source 1: NOAA
Source 2: XMACIS2 (temp records & 1981-2010 monthly max/mins)

== Demographics ==
As of the census of 2000, there were 646 people, 301 households, and 208 families residing in the town. The population density was 21.3 people per square mile (8.2/km^{2}). There were 1,103 housing units at an average density of 36.3 per square mile (14.0/km^{2}). The racial makeup of the town was 99.07% White, 0.46% from other races, and 0.46% from two or more races. Hispanic or Latino of any race were 2.01% of the population.

There were 301 households, out of which 19.6% had children under the age of 18 living with them, 64.5% were married couples living together, 2.7% had a female householder with no husband present, and 30.6% were non-families. 27.6% of all households were made up of individuals, and 14.6% had someone living alone who was 65 years of age or older. The average household size was 2.15 and the average family size was 2.56.

In the town, the population was spread out, with 16.1% under the age of 18, 2.8% from 18 to 24, 21.5% from 25 to 44, 30.2% from 45 to 64, and 29.4% who were 65 years of age or older. The median age was 51 years. For every 100 females, there were 113.2 males. For every 100 females age 18 and over, there were 103.0 males.

The median income for a household in the town was $37,500, and the median income for a family was $49,375. Males had a median income of $36,518 versus $20,114 for females. The per capita income for the town was $21,042. About 5.9% of families and 10.5% of the population were below the poverty line, including 6.1% of those under age 18 and 13.6% of those age 65 or over.

== Tourism ==
The town is best known for its chain of lakes. During the summer, the population increases dramatically as tourists come from all around the Midwest.

It is also known as an artists' enclave, with many artist studios and gift shops located in the town square and surrounding areas. Another tourist attraction is the water ski team, the Skiing Skeeters, who perform free shows two nights a week throughout the summer.

== Transportation ==
River's Edge BCycle station offers a bikeshare facility for the town with 10 e-bikes since 2021.

== Gallery ==
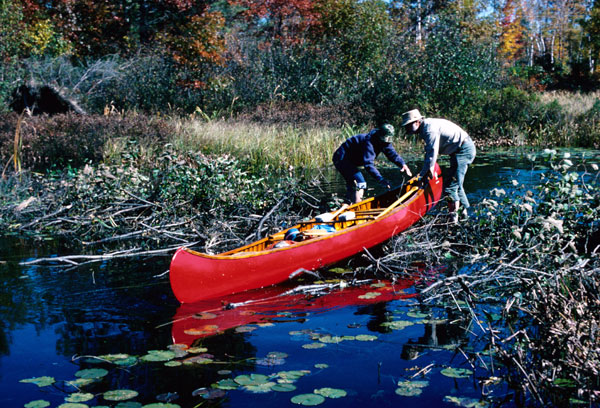
Wood-and-canvas canoe being lifted over a beaver dam near Manitowish Waters

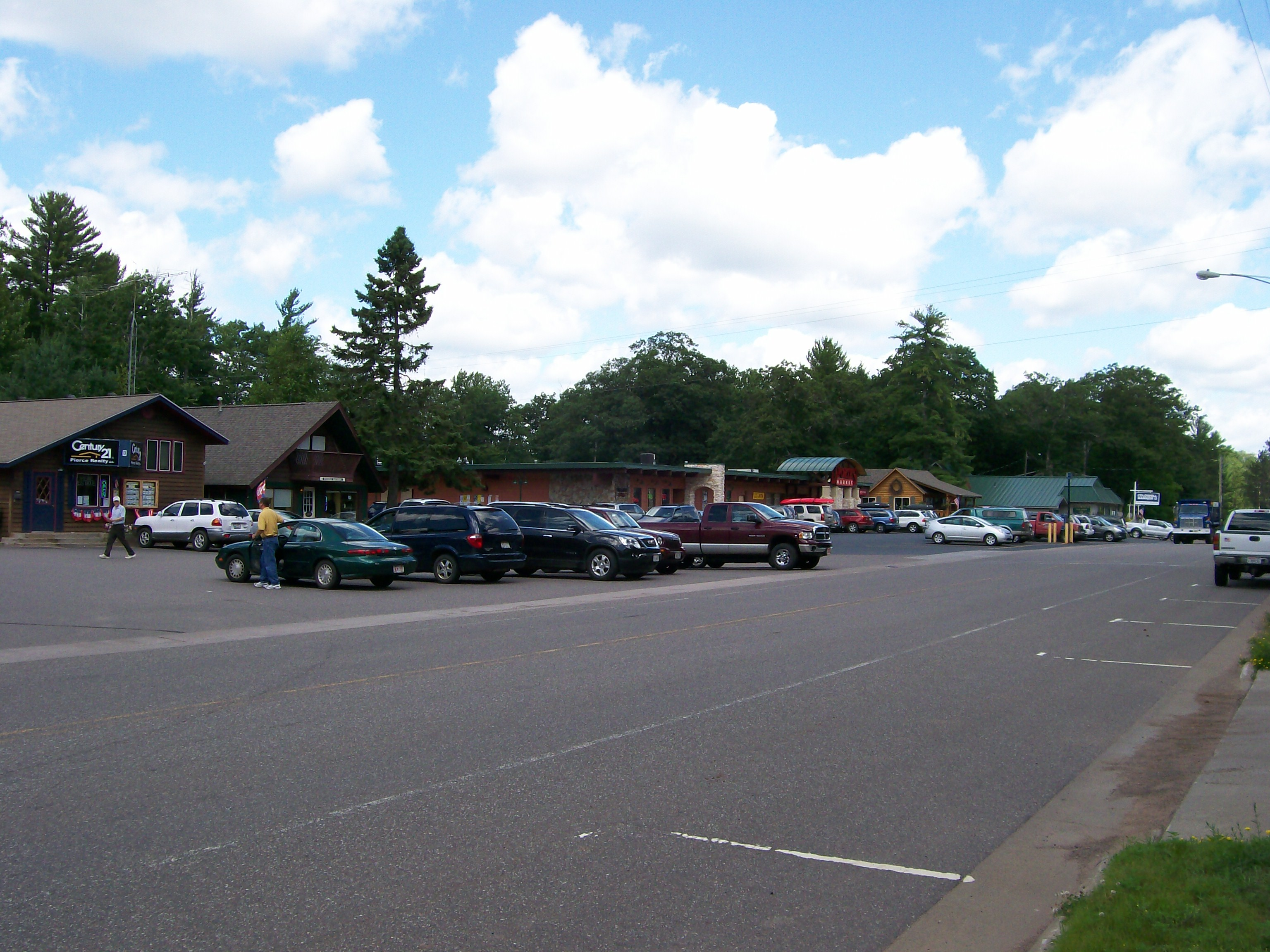
Town center, Manitowish Waters

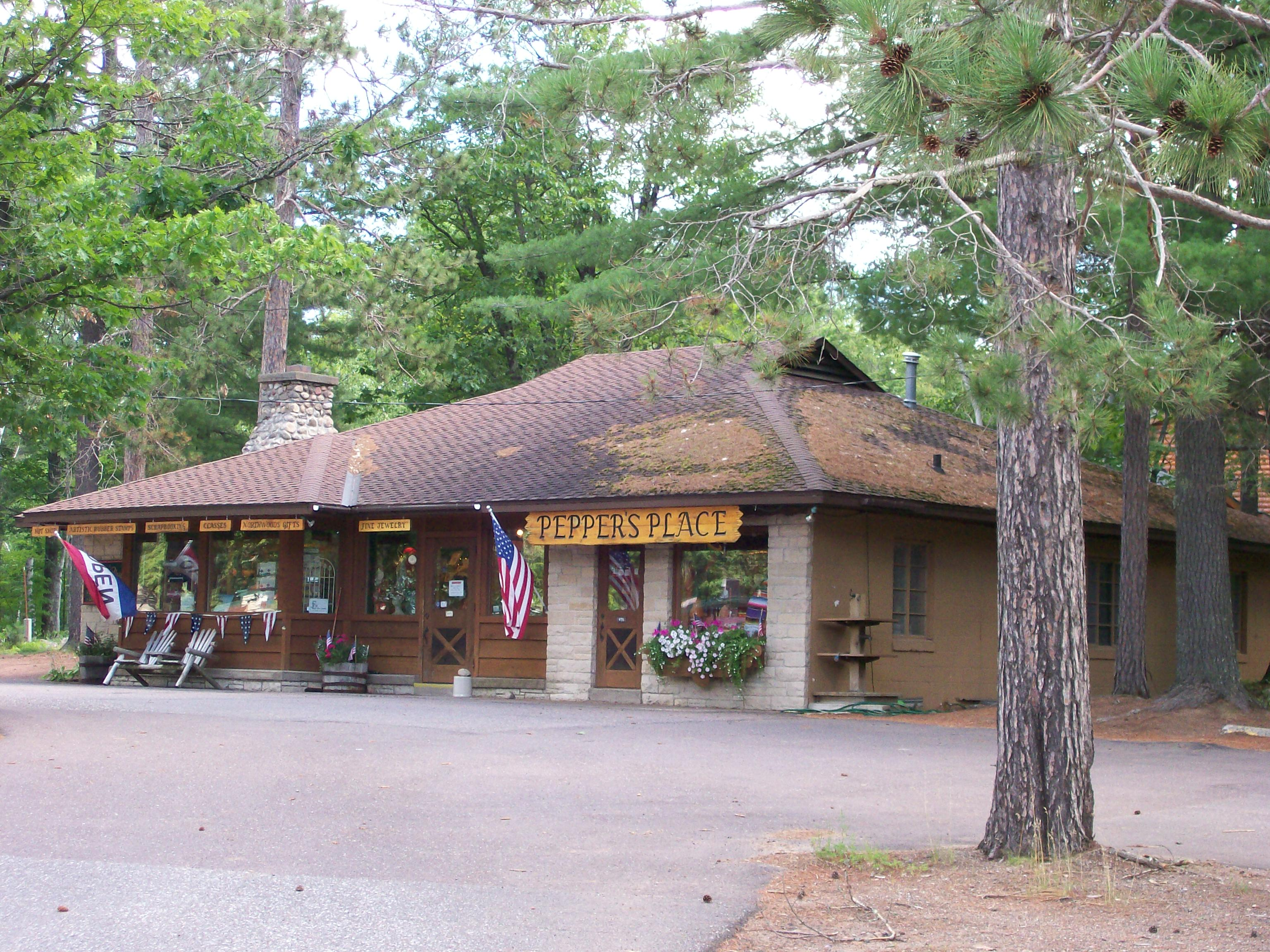
A typical gift shop in the area

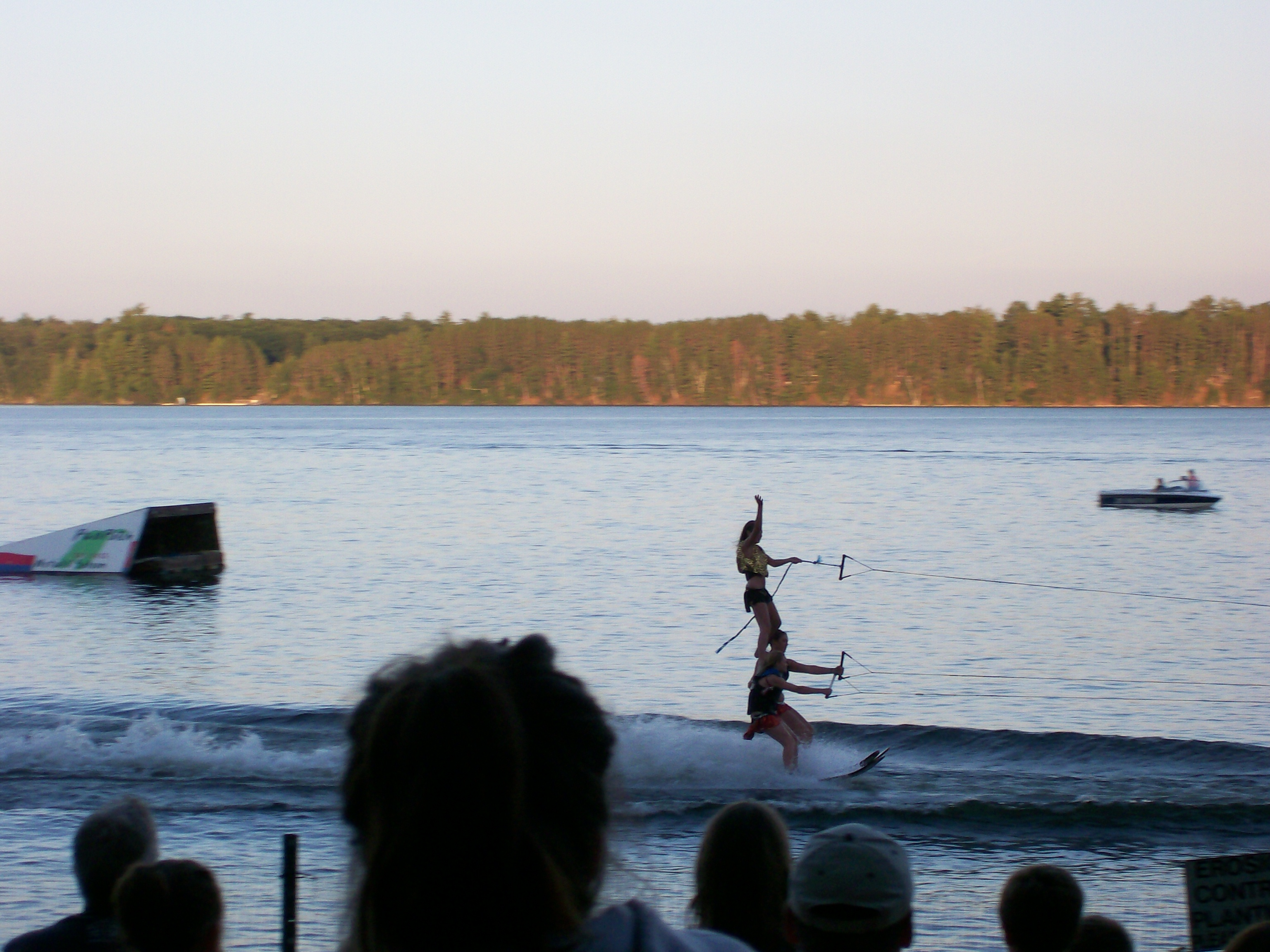
Members of the local ski team, the Skiing Skeeters, form a human pyramid

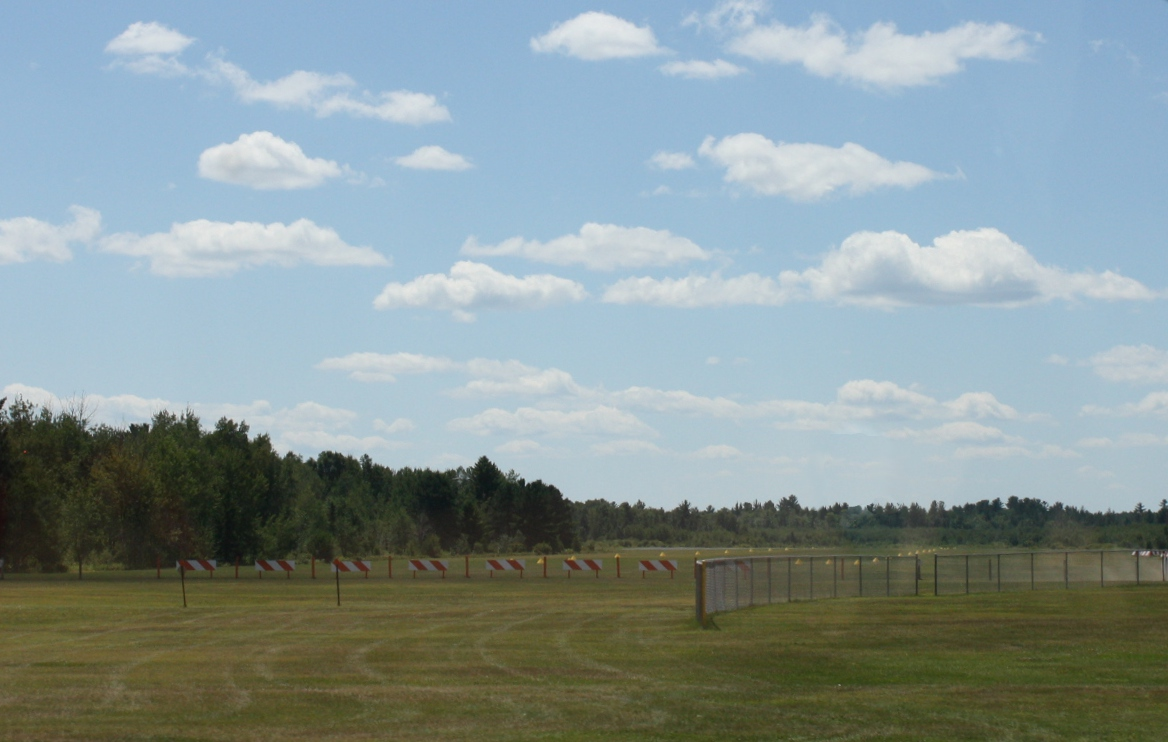
Manitowish Waters Airport

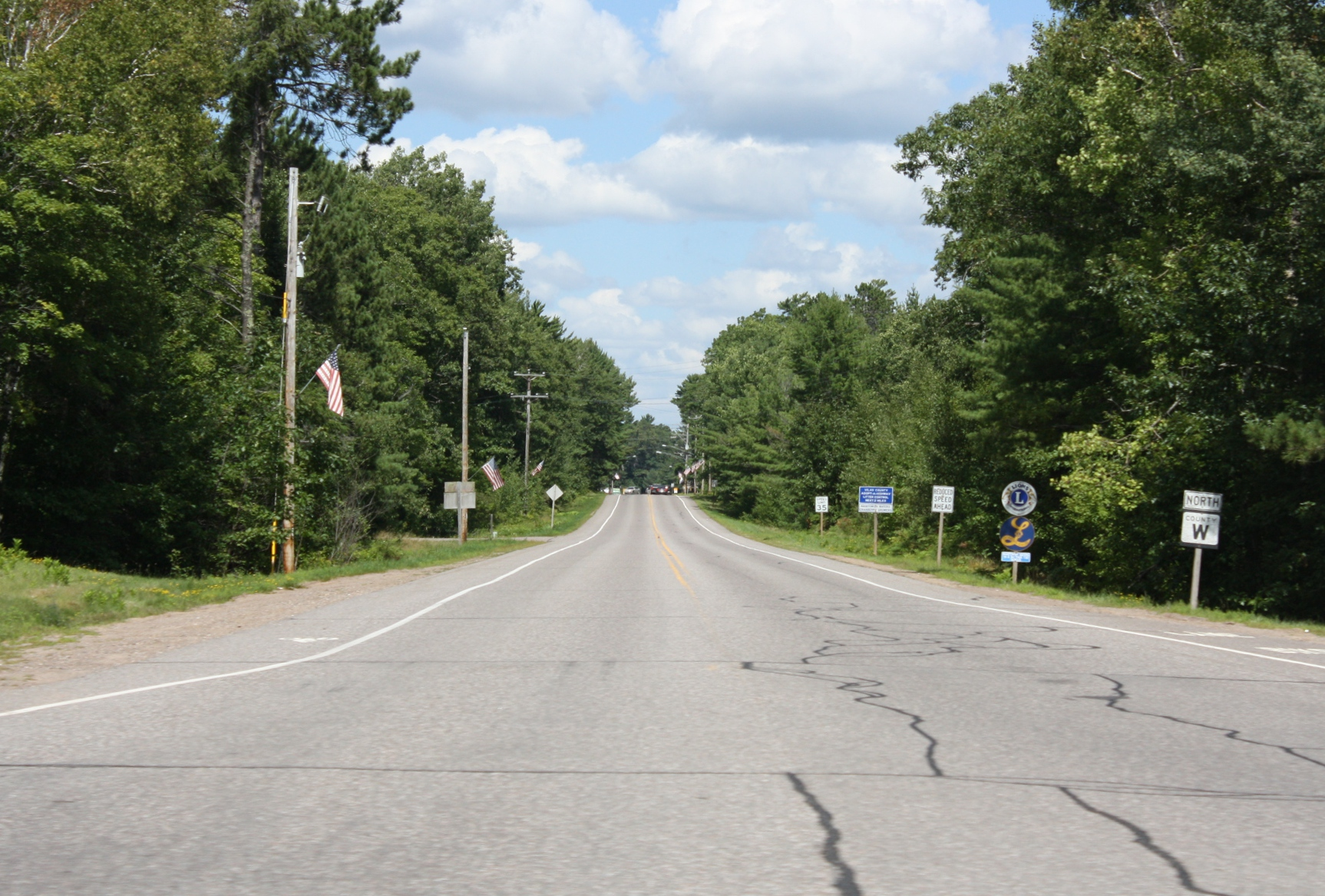
Looking north at the community of Manitowish Waters on County Road W

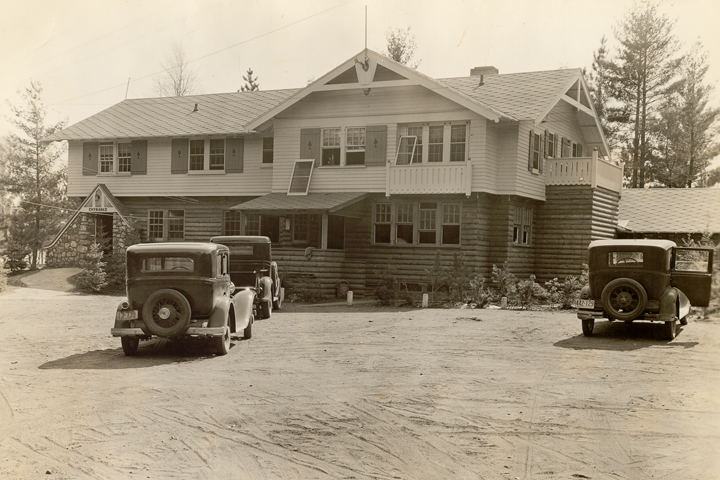
Little Bohemia Lodge as it looked in 1934

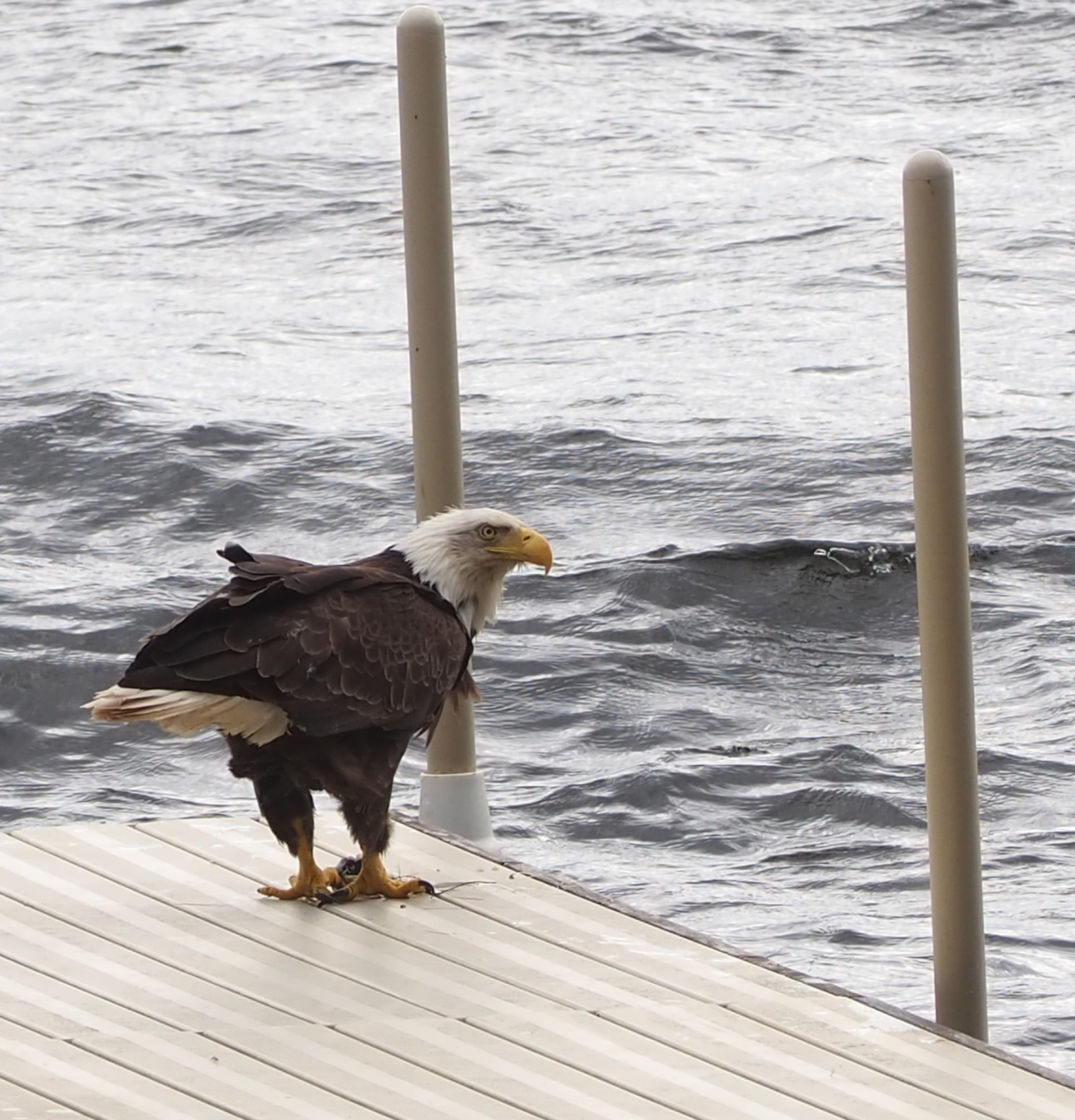
Keep an eye out for one of the many local eagles.
