= NBR N class =

Steam locomotive of the North British Railway

NBR Class N LNER Class D25
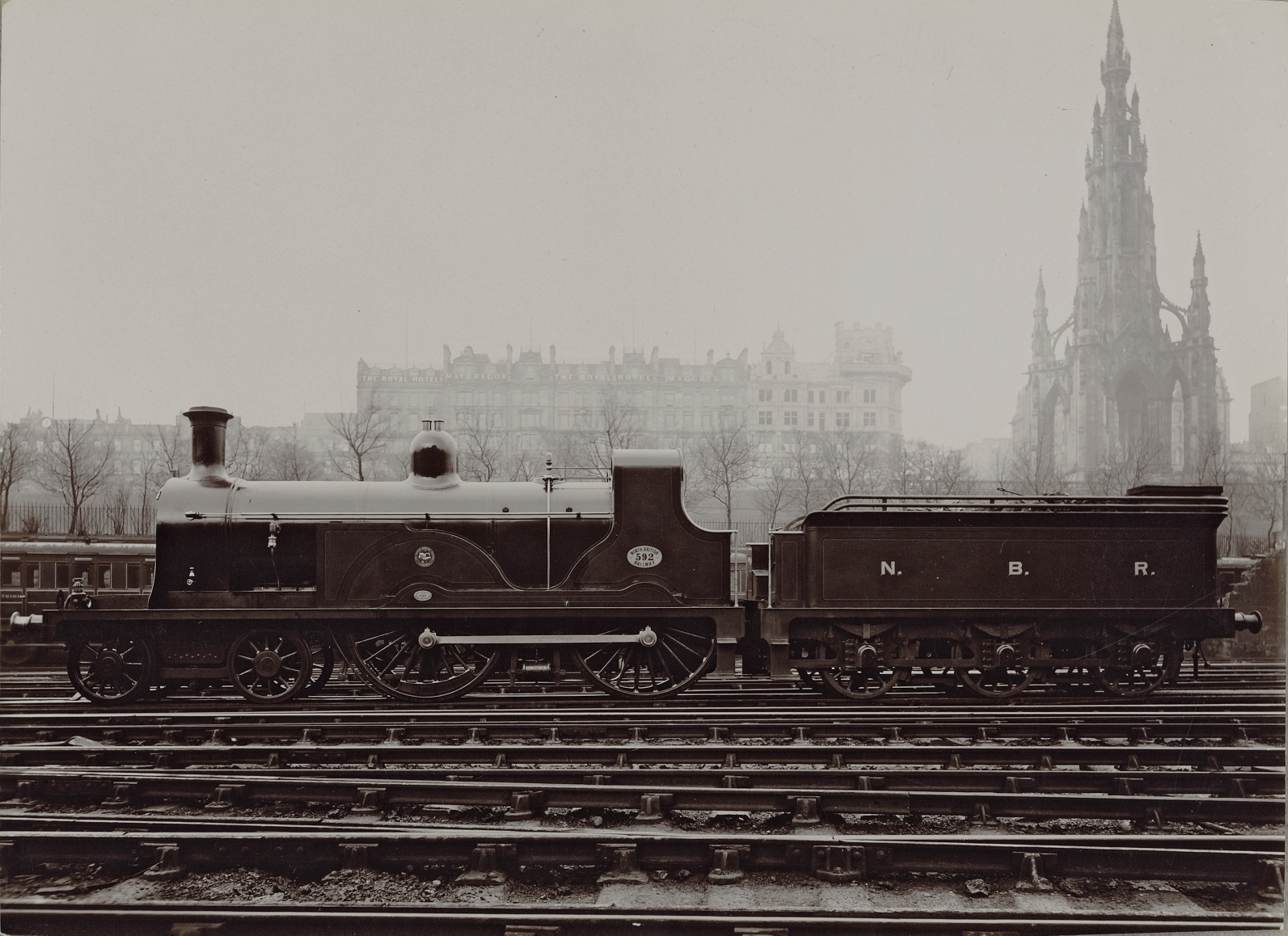
- Cowlairs Works, North British Railway (NBR) No. 592
Type and origin
- Power type: Steam
- Designer: Matthew Holmes
- Builder: North British Railway (Cowlairs)
- Build date: 1886-1888; Rebuilt 1911
- Total produced: 12
Specifications
- Configuration
  - Whyte: 4-4-0
- Gauge: 4 ft 8 1/2 in (1,435 mm)
- Leading dia.: 3 ft 6 in (1.07 m)
- Coupled dia.: 7 ft 0 in (2.13 m)
- Length: 22 ft 4 in (6.81 m) (engine only); 43 ft 8 in (13.31 m) (engine & tender)
- Loco weight: 46.4 long tons (47.1 t) (engine only); 78.4 long tons (79.7 t) (engine & tender)
- Fuel type: coal
- Firebox
  - Grate area: 20.3 square feet
- Boiler pressure: 150 psi (1.0 MPa)
- Cylinders: two inside
- Cylinder size: 18 in × 26 in (460 mm × 660 mm)
Performance figures
- Tractive effort: 12,786 lbf (56.87 kN)
Career
- Operators: North British Railway; London North Eastern Railway
- Withdrawn: 1926-1933
- Disposition: All scrapped

NBR Class N LNER Class D35
Type and origin
- Power type: Steam
- Designer: Matthew Holmes
- Builder: North British Railway (Cowlairs)
- Build date: 1894-1896; One rebuilt 1919 (as D36)
- Total produced: 24
Specifications
- Configuration
  - Whyte: 4-4-0
- Gauge: 4 ft 8 1/2 in (1,435 mm)
- Leading dia.: 3 ft 6 in (1.07 m)
- Coupled dia.: 5 ft 7 in (1.70 m)
- Length: 21 ft 3 in (6.48 m) (engine only); 42 ft 6 in (12.95 m) (engine & tender)
- Loco weight: 43.6 long tons (44.3 t) (engine only); 75.6 long tons (76.8 t) (engine & tender)
- Fuel type: coal
- Firebox
  - Grate area: 17 square feet
- Boiler pressure: 150 psi (1.0 MPa)
- Cylinders: two inside
- Cylinder size: 18 in × 24 in (460 mm × 610 mm)
Performance figures
- Tractive effort: 14,798 lbf (65.82 kN)
Career
- Operators: North British Railway; London North Eastern Railway
- Nicknames: West Highland Bogies
- Withdrawn: 1920-1924; Rebuilt D36 withdrawn 1944
- Disposition: All scrapped

The NBR Class N (later LNER Class D25) was a class of 4-4-0 steam locomotive of the North British Railway. The class was designed by Matthew Holmes (Locomotive Superintendent) and later rebuilt by Holmes's successor, Reid. A total of 12 were produced.

The NBR Class N (later LNER Class D35) was a very similar type of 4-4-0 locomotive, commonly known as the West Highland Bogies, and also designed by Matthew Holmes. A total of 24 were produced. Despite the good reputation enjoyed by Holmes, and the success of most of his designs, these locomotives are generally judged to have been a failure. As a result, one example was experimentally and significantly rebuilt (see below).

The NBR Class L (later LNER Class D36) was the designation of a single class D35 locomotive (number 695) which was comprehensively rebuilt by Reid in 1919, and superheated. The rebuild was so major that the NBR, renowned for grouping similar engines into the same class designation, actually applied a different designation to the rebuilt locomotive. The experiment was successful, but proved more expensive than the construction of replacement engines, so no further D35 types were rebuilt into D36s. Thus the class only ever consisted of one locomotive.

== Build dates ==
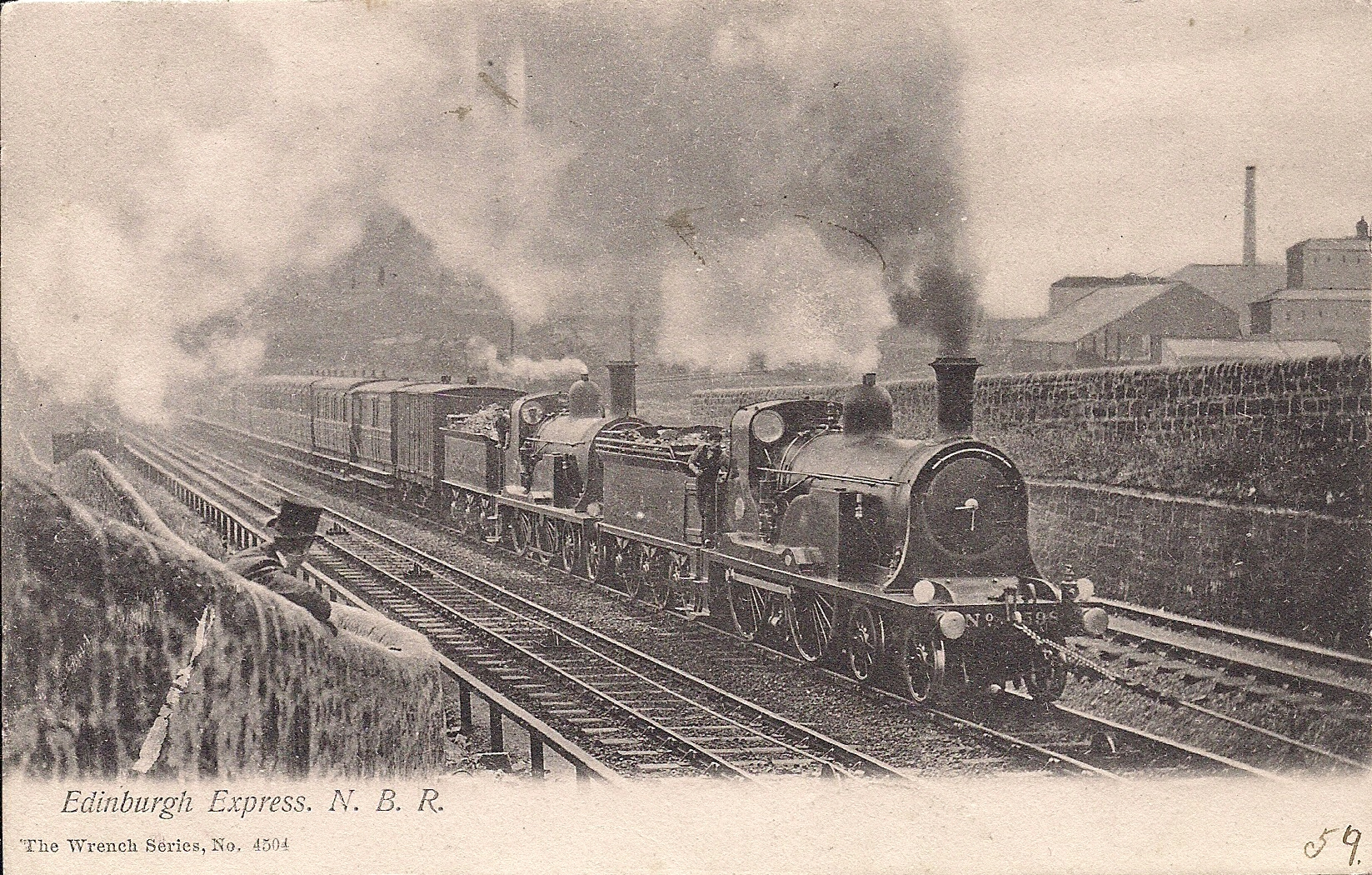
Two N class locomotives on Cowlairs Bank in original condition (prior to their 1911 rebuild).

The initial class N machines (later D25) were built by the North British Railway between 1886 and 1888. The original engine, number 592, was exhibited in Edinburgh before entering service, and had the unusual distinction of running through the city's public streets (under its own power) on temporary tracks when it was transferred back to the main line. All 12 engines were rebuilt in 1911.

The later class N locomotives (subsequently D35) were built in four batches. The first two batches were built during 1894, to provide locomotives for the opening of the West Highland Railway. In 1896 two further batches were ordered. Each batch consisted of 6 engines, giving the class total of 24 engines. Locomotive 695 was rebuilt in 1919 to form the sole example of the new class L.

== History ==
Although both engine types were included in the class N designation when the NBR adopted formal class designations in 1913, the LNER did not consider the locomotives to be of the same class, and in 1923 (on grouping) the original Holmes N class became LNER class D25, whilst the "West Highland Bogie" Holmes N class became LNER class D35. The single rebuilt locomotive was considered a different class (after rebuilding) by both companies, and was therefore designated L (NBR) or D36 (LNER).

=== Class N (D25) ===
The Class N (D25) engines were built for express passenger service when the NBR was preparing for significant expansion of its timetable following the reopening of the Tay Rail Bridge. The bridge had been closed for several years following the 1879 Tay Bridge disaster. The engines performed admirably, and were popular with railway staff, several being recorded in use on Royal trains of the period. In later life they were relegated to more routine duties. Withdrawals commenced in 1926, with operational duties ending in 1932. One engine remained in commission as a reserve locomotive (but without being used) from 1931 until formally withdrawn and scrapped in 1933. This was the end of the class.

=== Class N (D35) ===
The class N (D35) engines were specially designed and built to operate the then brand new West Highland Line. This line linked Glasgow with Fort William, and later (following extension) went on to Mallaig. The line is still in operation. The route includes several notable features, including Rannoch railway station on Rannoch Moor, the Horse Shoe Curve, and Glenfinnan Viaduct. Being specially designed for this line, the class N (D35) engines became known colloquially as the "West Highland Bogies". However their performance and adhesion was poor, and they are generally considered the least successful of all designs by Matthew Holmes. Within a shorter than expected period they were replaced on the West Highland Line by more efficient engines, and the class N machines were relegated to perfunctory duties as shunters and station pilot engines. The engines were withdrawn prematurely between 1920 and 1924, having served well under 30 years, much of that time on shunting duties, with the single exception of the locomotive rebuilt as a class L (see below).

=== Class L (D36) ===
The class L (D36) engine started life as N class engine number 695 (later number 9695 of the LNER). It was an attempt by William P. Reid to solve the problems of poor and inefficient running in the class N (D35) engines. The rebuilt locomotive was a success and had a long service life. However, it remained less efficient than newer locomotive designs of a similar type, and the extent of the rebuild made it costly. It was not considered worthwhile to rebuild any other D35 types, leading almost immediately to those engines being withdrawn and scrapped. The single class L (D36) engine continued in successful revenue earning service until 1943. Its final role was with training for air raid precautions before being scrapped in 1944, having been in service for exactly 50 years.

== Preservation ==
The last class N (D25) was scrapped in 1933. No examples of this class were preserved.

The last class N (D35) was scrapped in 1924. No examples of this class were preserved.

The single class L (D36) was scrapped in 1944. No part is preserved.

== Sources ==
- Ian Allan ABC of British Railways Locomotives, 1948 edition, part 4.
