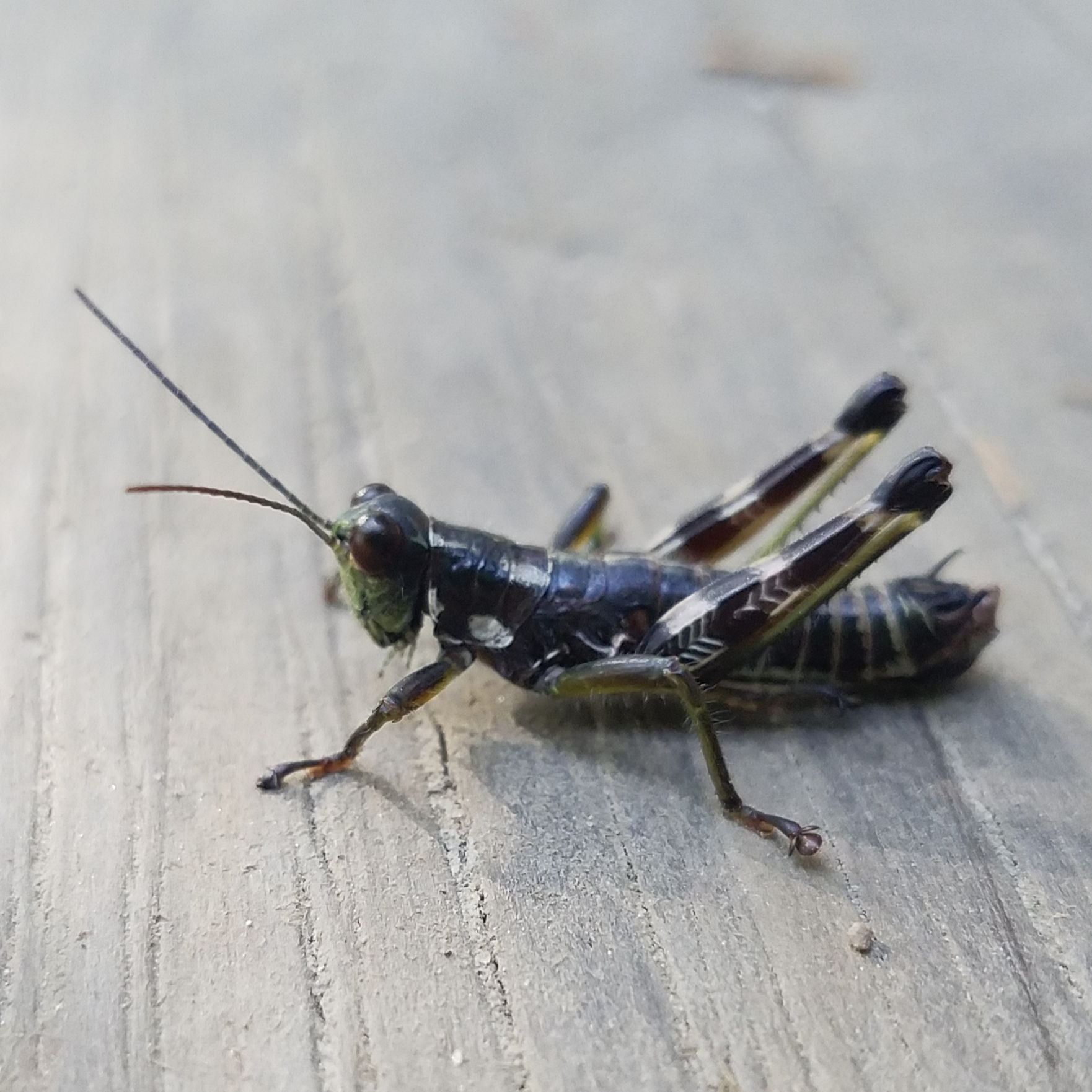

Scientific classification
- Kingdom: Animalia
- Phylum: Arthropoda
- Clade: Pancrustacea
- Class: Insecta
- Order: Orthoptera
- Suborder: Caelifera
- Family: Acrididae
- Subfamily: Melanoplinae
- Tribe: Podismini
- Genus: Booneacris
- Species: B. glacialis

Binomial name
- Booneacris glacialis (Scudder, 1863)

= Booneacris glacialis =

Species of grasshopper

Booneacris glacialis, the wingless mountain grasshopper, is a species of spur-throated grasshopper in the family Acrididae. It is found in North America.

== Subspecies ==
These three subspecies belong to the species Booneacris glacialis:

- Booneacris glacialis amplicerca (Caudell, 1936)^{i c g}
- Booneacris glacialis canadensis (E. M. Walker, 1903)^{i c g}
- Booneacris glacialis glacialis (Scudder, 1863)^{i c g}

Data sources: i = ITIS, c = Catalogue of Life, g = GBIF, b = Bugguide.net
