= List of lakes of Wisconsin =

There are over 15,000 lakes in Wisconsin. Of these, about 40 percent have been named. Excluding Lake Michigan and Lake Superior, Lake Winnebago is the largest lake by area, largest by volume and the lake with the longest shoreline. The deepest lake is Wazee Lake, at 350 feet (107 meters). The deepest natural lake is Green Lake, at 237 feet (72 meters). The largest artificial lake is Petenwell Lake. Many lakes have the same names, with over 150 named Mud Lake and over 100 named Bass Lake.

Excluding the Great Lakes, the 10 largest lakes in Wisconsin

== List of named lakes ==
Below is the list of named lakes/reservoirs in Wisconsin, as identified by the USGS and/or the WIDNR. Areas and max depths are provided by WIDNR unless otherwise noted. Alternate names are indicated in parentheses. Only included are lakes over 100 acres.

Lake/Reservoir Name	County	Area (acres)	Max depth (feet)	Coordinates	Notes
Lake Superior	Ashland, Bayfield, Douglas, Iron (9 counties in Michigan, 3 counties in Minnesota, 2 districts in Ontario)	20,288,000	1,333	47°42′00″N 87°30′00″W	1,283,140 acres are in Wisconsin; the max depth in Wisconsin is 600 feet
Lake Michigan	Brown, Door, Kenosha, Kewaunee, Manitowoc, Marinette, Milwaukee, Oconto, Ozaukee, Racine, Sheboygan (2 counties in Illinois, 3 counties in Indiana, 18 counties in Michigan)	14,338,560	923	44°00′00″N 87°00′00″W	4,709,120 acres are in Wisconsin; the max depth in Wisconsin is 858 feet
Lake Winnebago	Calumet, Fond du Lac, Winnebago	131,939	21	44°01′01″N 88°24′34″W	
Lake Pepin	Buffalo, Pepin, Pierce	24,550	60	44°29′49″N 92°17′31″W	
Petenwell Lake	Adams, Juneau, Wood	23,173	44	44°08′13″N 89°57′50″W	
Lake Chippewa (Chippewa Flowage)	Sawyer	14,593	92	45°56′01″N 91°11′00″W	
Lake Poygan	Waushara, Winnebago	14,024	11	44°08′46″N 88°50′21″W	
Castle Rock Lake	Adams, Juneau	13,955	35	43°57′20″N 90°02′16″W	
Turtle-Flambeau Flowage	Iron	12,942	50	46°04′30″N 90°10′48″W	
Lake Koshkonong	Dane, Jefferson, Rock	10,595	7	42°52′21″N 88°57′40″W	
Lake Mendota	Dane	9,781	83	43°06′18″N 89°25′12″W	
Lake Butte des Morts (Big Lake Butte des Morts)	Winnebago	8,581	9	44°04′13″N 88°38′19″W	
Lake Onalaska	La Crosse	8,391	40	43°54′18″N 91°17′57″W	
Green Lake (Big Green Lake)	Green Lake	7,920	236	43°48′37″N 89°00′07″W	
Lake Saint Croix	Pierce, St. Croix (Washington, Minnesota)	7,696	60	44°55′57″N 92°45′25″W	
Lake Wisconsin	Columbia, Sauk	7,197	24	43°22′16″N 89°36′11″W	
Beaver Dam Lake	Dodge	6,718	7	43°29′10″N 88°51′47″W	
Big Eau Pleine Reservoir	Marathon	6,348	46	44°44′27″N 89°49′17″W	
Shawano Lake	Shawano	6,215	39	44°48′27″N 88°31′07″W	
Lake Wissota	Chippewa	6,148	64	44°57′40″N 91°19′13″W	
Geneva Lake	Walworth	5,401	135	42°33′54″N 88°30′13″W	
Lac Courte Oreilles	Sawyer	5,139	90	45°53′43″N 91°26′04″W	
Puckaway Lake	Green Lake, Marquette	5,013	5	43°45′24″N 89°10′13″W	
Sturgeon Bay	Door	4,945	60	44°52′06″N 87°23′51″W	This is officially classed by the WIDNR as a lake, but is technically a bay
Lake DuBay	Marathon, Portage	4,649	30	44°41′48″N 89°41′13″W	
Lake Winneshiek	Crawford	4,635	24	43°15′39″N 91°03′15″W	
Lake Winneconne	Winnebago	4,553	9	44°08′25″N 88°43′58″W	
Willow Flowage	Oneida	4,217	30	45°43′10″N 89°52′53″W	
Lac Vieux Desert	Vilas (Gogebic, Michigan)	4,017	38	46°08′09″N 89°06′54″W	
Wigwam Slough	La Crosse, Vernon	3,988	23	43°44′06″N 91°13′50″W	
Trout Lake	Vilas	3,864	117	46°02′29″N 89°40′17″W	
Pelican Lake	Oneida	3,545	39	45°30′21″N 89°11′57″W	
Fence Lake	Vilas	3,483	86	45°57′03″N 89°50′22″W	
Long Lake	Washburn	3,478	74	45°42′26″N 91°40′14″W	
Tomahawk Lake	Oneida	3,462	84	45°49′51″N 89°38′51″W	
Pool 9	Crawford (Allamakee, Iowa)	3,373	36	43°13′08″N 91°05′33″W	Not included in the WIDNR list of lakes.
Lake Monona	Dane	3,359	74	43°04′06″N 89°21′29″W	
Round Lake (Big Round Lake)	Sawyer	3,294	74	46°00′52″N 91°19′03″W	
Lake Kegonsa	Dane	3,200	32	42°57′53″N 89°15′13″W	
Grindstone Lake	Sawyer	3,176	60	45°56′07″N 91°24′55″W	
Rainbow Flowage	Oneida	3,153	28	45°51′30″N 89°30′51″W	
Gile Flowage	Iron	3,138	25	46°23′44″N 90°13′50″W	
Sinissippi Lake (Hustisford Lake)	Dodge	3,078	8	43°22′14″N 88°36′42″W	
Namekagon Lake (Spring Lake, Garden Lake)	Bayfield	2,897	51	46°13′18″N 91°06′07″W	
Holcombe Flowage	Chippewa, Rusk	2,881	62	45°16′38″N 91°06′04″W	
North Twin Lake	Vilas	2,871	60	46°03′12″N 89°07′53″W	
Rush Lake	Fond du Lac, Winnebago	2,729	5	43°55′38″N 88°48′01″W	
Nelson Lake (Totagatic Flowage)	Sawyer	2,716	33	46°04′43″N 91°28′23″W	
Fox Lake	Dodge	2,713	19	43°35′05″N 88°55′25″W	
Shell Lake	Washburn	2,513	36	45°44′02″N 91°53′59″W	
Wisconsin River Flowage	Portage	2,489	25	44°33′02″N 89°37′27″W	
Pewaukee Lake	Waukesha	2,437	45	43°04′23″N 88°18′24″W	
Big Lake	Buffalo	2,400	25	44°22′49″N 91°57′57″W	
Lake Chetac	Sawyer	2,400	26	45°42′38″N 91°29′51″W	
Lake Noquebay	Marinette	2,398	51	45°15′24″N 87°54′30″W	
Chequamegon Waters Flowage	Taylor	2,366	22	45°12′42″N 90°42′08″W	
Yellow Lake	Burnett	2,283	31	45°55′09″N 92°23′55″W	
Lake Nokomis	Lincoln, Oneida	2,274	33	45°33′32″N 89°43′38″W	
Saint Croix Flowage (Gordon Lake)	Douglas	2,247	28	46°15′22″N 91°52′17″W	
Muskego Lake	Waukesha	2,194	23	42°52′36″N 88°06′46″W	
Biron Flowage	Portage, Wood	2,187	23	44°26′55″N 89°42′23″W	
Buffalo Lake	Marquette	2,179	8	43°46′28″N 89°24′15″W	
Lake Waubesa	Dane	2,074	38	43°00′41″N 89°19′24″W	
Metonga Lake	Forest	2,038	79	45°32′27″N 88°54′15″W	
Delavan Lake	Walworth	1,906	52	42°36′16″N 88°36′39″W	
Balsam Lake	Polk	1,901	37	45°27′55″N 92°25′38″W	
Red Cedar Lake	Barron, Washburn	1,897	53	45°36′32″N 91°35′10″W	
Dairyland Reservoir (Flambeau Lake)	Rusk	1,870	70	45°31′45″N 91°00′09″W	
Kilbourn Flowage	Adams, Juneau	1,868	35	43°40′28″N 89°48′20″W	
Lake Wausau	Marathon	1,851	30	44°56′04″N 89°38′51″W	
Thunder Lake	Oneida	1,794	9	45°47′16″N 89°13′01″W	
Pine Lake	Forest	1,673	15	45°40′36″N 88°58′51″W	
Bone Lake	Polk	1,667	43	45°32′06″N 92°23′21″W	
Big Saint Germain Lake	Vilas	1,622	42	45°56′03″N 89°31′11″W	
Tainter Lake	Dunn	1,605	37	44°58′39″N 91°51′22″W	
Chief Lake	Sawyer	1,590	37	45°53′58″N 91°17′21″W	Not included in the WIDNR list of lakes.
Minong Flowage (Lake Nancy)	Douglas, Washburn	1,587	21	46°09′18″N 91°55′33″W	
Moose Lake	Sawyer	1,559	21	46°00′36″N 91°02′10″W	
Lake Mohawksin	Lincoln	1,515	25	45°28′06″N 89°45′03″W	
Crawling Stone Lake	Vilas	1,483	87	45°56′18″N 89°53′02″W	
High Falls Reservoir	Marinette	1,471	54	45°18′15″N 88°11′47″W	
Grand River Marsh	Green Lake, Marquette	1,446	7	43°43′15″N 89°13′41″W	
Lake Alice	Lincoln	1,438	32	45°28′59″N 89°38′19″W	
Big Sand Lake	Burnett	1,434	55	45°49′29″N 92°13′10″W	
Big Sand Lake	Vilas	1,427	56	46°03′47″N 88°58′55″W	
Ike Walton Lake	Vilas	1,417	61	46°02′09″N 89°48′22″W	
Prairie Lake	Barron	1,408	16	45°21′31″N 91°40′58″W	
Rhinelander Flowage	Oneida	1,372	10	45°41′39″N 89°28′01″W	
Rock Lake	Jefferson	1,365	60	43°04′42″N 88°55′50″W	
Bear Lake	Barron, Washburn	1,348	87	45°37′49″N 91°49′20″W	
Lake Minocqua	Oneida	1,339	60	45°52′19″N 89°41′49″W	
Clam Lake	Burnett	1,338	11	45°47′35″N 92°19′31″W	
Squirrel Lake	Oneida, Vilas	1,309	46	45°52′07″N 89°53′42″W	
Legend Lake	Menominee	1,304	74	44°53′14″N 88°37′46″W	
Pickerel Lake	Forest, Langlade	1,272	19	45°23′47″N 88°54′32″W	
Mud Lake	La Crosse, Trempealeau	1,270	18	43°58′00″N 91°22′53″W	
Lost Land Lake	Sawyer	1,264	21	46°06′04″N 91°08′46″W	
Lake Owen	Bayfield	1,250	95	46°16′59″N 91°13′38″W	
Butternut Lake	Forest	1,246	42	45°54′42″N 88°59′20″W	
Spirit River Flowage	Lincoln	1,220	25	45°26′42″N 89°46′58″W	
Star Lake	Vilas	1,219	68	46°01′23″N 89°29′03″W	
Okauchee Lake	Waukesha	1,210	90	43°07′33″N 88°25′36″W	
Little Rice Lake	Forest	1,201	10	45°35′36″N 88°59′52″W	
Little Lake Butte des Morts	Winnebago	1,200	18	44°12′45″N 88°27′42″W	
Spider Lake	Sawyer	1,194	64	46°05′51″N 91°13′14″W	
Wapogasset Lake	Polk	1,189	32	45°19′54″N 92°25′44″W	
Partridge Lake	Waupaca	1,185	4	44°16′34″N 88°53′25″W	
White Sand Lake	Vilas	1,181	63	46°00′23″N 89°50′07″W	
Flambeau Lake	Vilas	1,166	78	45°57′53″N 89°55′25″W	
Presque Isle Lake	Vilas	1,165	103	46°13′21″N 89°46′48″W	
Beaver Dam Lake	Barron	1,163	106	45°33′04″N 92°01′56″W	
Kangaroo Lake	Door	1,156	12	45°02′06″N 87°09′31″W	
Lac La Belle	Waukesha	1,154	45	43°07′48″N 88°31′07″W	
Spooner Lake	Washburn	1,132	17	45°50′23″N 91°49′29″W	
McKenzie Lake	Burnett, Washburn	1,129	71	45°55′06″N 92°02′19″W	
Cedar Lake	Polk, St. Croix	1,120	32	45°12′51″N 92°34′19″W	
Big Arbor Vitae Lake	Vilas	1,070	41	45°55′49″N 89°38′59″W	
Little Sturgeon Bay	Door	1,068	33	44°50′20″N 87°32′59″W	This is officially classed by the WIDNR as a lake, but is technically a bay
White Lake	Waupaca	1,064	10	44°21′58″N 88°55′59″W	
Caldron Falls Reservoir	Marinette, Oconto	1,063	40	45°21′26″N 88°13′54″W	
Plum Lake	Vilas	1,057	57	46°00′12″N 89°31′09″W	
Pokegama Lake	Vilas	1,041	65	45°59′32″N 89°53′16″W	
Lake Lucerne	Forest	1,039	73	45°31′37″N 88°50′47″W	
Teal Lake	Sawyer	1,024	31	46°05′08″N 91°06′15″W	
Upper Eau Claire Lake	Bayfield	1,024	92	46°18′34″N 91°28′44″W	
White Potato Lake	Oconto	1,023	11	45°08′39″N 88°12′38″W	
Big Round Lake	Polk	1,014	17	45°31′28″N 92°18′05″W	
Catfish Lake (Voyageur Lake)	Vilas	1,012	30	45°53′47″N 89°11′34″W	
Planting Ground Lake	Oneida	1,010	37	45°50′07″N 89°09′25″W	
Lake Menomin	Dunn	1,009	34	44°53′33″N 91°54′45″W	
Little Trout Lake	Vilas	1,007	98	46°03′55″N 89°51′10″W	
Kentuck Lake	Forest, Vilas	1,001	40	45°59′07″N 88°59′59″W	
Spirit Lake	Douglas	996	28	46°41′11″N 92°11′24″W	
Lake Nebagamon	Douglas	986	56	46°30′09″N 91°42′05″W	
Butternut Lake	Ashland, Price	983	32	45°58′04″N 90°31′07″W	
Nagawicka Lake	Waukesha	981	90	43°04′29″N 88°23′19″W	
Devils Lake	Burnett	975	24	45°54′33″N 92°20′16″W	
Little Saint Germain Lake	Vilas	972	53	45°54′12″N 89°27′18″W	USGS considers this 3 lakes, the others named East Bay Little Saint Germain Lake and West Bay Little Saint Germain Lake
Como Lake	Walworth	955	9	42°35′59″N 88°29′30″W	
Chippewa Falls Flowage 5555	Chippewa, Eau Claire	954	29	44°55′54″N 91°23′28″W	
McCartney Lake	Grant	952	10	42°40′57″N 90°52′42″W	
Sand Lake	Sawyer	949	50	45°51′08″N 91°29′44″W	
Cedar Lake	Washington	937	105	43°23′03″N 88°15′45″W	
Long Lake	Chippewa	936	101	45°15′07″N 91°24′14″W	
Phantom Flowage	Burnett	932		45°49′25″N 92°38′55″W	
Cranberry Lake	Oneida, Vilas	924	23	45°54′05″N 89°09′49″W	
Lake Chetek	Barron	923	22	45°18′57″N 91°37′45″W	
Wind Lake	Racine	919	47	42°49′26″N 88°08′28″W	
Crab Lake	Vilas	909	60	46°11′41″N 89°43′10″W	
Sand Lake	Burnett	900	73	45°55′05″N 92°10′24″W	
Big Muskellunge Lake	Vilas	897	70	46°01′03″N 89°36′54″W	
Cornell Flowage	Chippewa	897	55	45°10′16″N 91°10′00″W	
Long Lake	Vilas	886	88	46°03′52″N 89°01′21″W	
Mason Lake	Adams, Marquette	882	9	43°39′28″N 89°36′29″W	
Middle Eau Claire Lake	Bayfield	880	66	46°17′44″N 91°31′17″W	
Clear Lake	Oneida	873	95	45°52′13″N 89°37′29″W	
Eau Claire Lake	Eau Claire	870	25	44°45′41″N 91°06′19″W	
Chalk Hill Flowage	Marinette	866	30	45°32′57″N 87°48′59″W	
Clark Lake	Door	865	25	44°56′11″N 87°12′12″W	
Island Lake	Vilas	865	35	46°07′00″N 89°47′31″W	
Rice Lake	Barron	859	19	45°30′26″N 91°43′29″W	
Lower Ninemile Lake	Oneida, Vilas	849	5	45°53′55″N 89°05′43″W	
Whitefish Lake (Bardon Lake, Bee Lake)	Douglas	848	102	46°12′50″N 91°52′20″W	
Big Lake	Oneida	845	27	45°45′34″N 89°07′12″W	
Solberg Lake	Price	844	16	45°45′14″N 90°22′19″W	
Franklin Lake	Forest	839	46	45°56′08″N 89°00′05″W	
Upper Saint Croix Lake	Douglas	828	22	46°21′24″N 91°48′14″W	
Big Lake	Vilas	827	61	46°09′17″N 89°46′11″W	
Tiger Cat Flowage (Twin Lakes)	Sawyer	819	30	46°03′11″N 91°16′25″W	
Oconomowoc Lake	Waukesha	818	60	43°05′56″N 88°27′12″W	
Mud Lake	Columbia	817		43°24′42″N 89°17′26″W	
Lake Beulah	Walworth	812	58	42°49′19″N 88°23′20″W	USGS considers this as two lakes, the other named Marsh Lake
Sprague-Mather Flowage	Juneau	810	9	44°08′32″N 90°10′53″W	
Sissabagama Lake	Sawyer	805	48	45°47′27″N 91°31′05″W	
Whitefish Lake	Sawyer	800	105	45°51′46″N 91°26′43″W	
Deer Lake	Polk	786	46	45°24′10″N 92°31′22″W	
Trude Lake	Iron	786	48	46°06′52″N 90°09′17″W	
Lower Eau Claire Lake	Bayfield, Douglas	784	41	46°16′24″N 91°33′04″W	
Big Lake	Vilas (Gogebic, Michigan)	780	30	46°12′00″N 89°26′48″W	
Arbutus Lake	Clark, Jackson	774	50	44°25′41″N 90°43′22″W	
Birch Island Lake	Burnett	768	13	45°56′34″N 92°08′44″W	
Upper Post Lake	Langlade, Oneida	765	14	45°27′34″N 89°05′07″W	
Rice River Flowage (Nokomis Lake)	Lincoln, Oneida	764	26	45°33′13″N 89°46′40″W	
Lake Nancy	Washburn	757	39	46°05′19″N 91°59′05″W	
Webb Lake (Web Lake)	Burnett	756	31	46°01′51″N 92°08′06″W	
Round Lake	Price	748	24	45°55′39″N 90°04′06″W	
White Sand Lake	Vilas	746	71	46°05′19″N 89°35′39″W	
High Lake	Vilas	741	36	46°09′21″N 89°32′55″W	
Pike Lake	Price	741	17	45°53′59″N 90°04′00″W	
Amber Lake	Oneida, Vilas	736	21	45°53′04″N 89°59′41″W	
Winter Lake (Price Flowage)	Sawyer	733	22	45°48′57″N 90°59′06″W	
Dam Lake	Oneida	732	32	45°51′56″N 89°24′02″W	
Elizabeth Lake (South Twin Lake)	Kenosha (McHenry, Illinois)	725	32	42°30′25″N 88°16′14″W	
Altoona Lake	Eau Claire	720	25	44°48′54″N 91°25′23″W	
Two Sisters Lake (Black Lake)	Oneida	719	63	45°46′16″N 89°31′36″W	
Mosinee Flowage	Marathon	716	18	44°47′51″N 89°41′57″W	
Pine Lake	Waukesha	711	85	43°07′10″N 88°23′02″W	
Kawaguesaga Lake	Oneida	700	44	45°52′03″N 89°44′18″W	
Shishebogama Lake	Oneida, Vilas	700	42	45°53′51″N 89°49′13″W	
Rolling Stone Lake	Langlade	682	12	45°26′06″N 88°56′48″W	
Columbus Lake	Oneida	677	26	45°50′15″N 89°15′09″W	
Big Crooked Lake	Vilas	665	34	46°08′26″N 89°40′16″W	
Big Fork Lake	Oneida	663	37	45°49′46″N 89°05′51″W	
Rest Lake	Vilas	655	53	46°08′26″N 89°52′30″W	
Sheboygan Lake	Sheboygan	646	4	43°50′19″N 88°04′16″W	
Palmer Lake	Vilas	644	13	46°11′59″N 89°29′59″W	
Big Pine Lake	Iron, Price	642	22	45°59′04″N 90°03′50″W	
Buckskin Lake	Oneida, Vilas	642	22	45°53′39″N 89°56′13″W	
Lake Redstone	Sauk	635	36	43°36′24″N 90°05′33″W	
Lake Laura	Vilas	628	43	46°03′25″N 89°26′17″W	
South Twin Lake	Vilas	628	43	46°01′53″N 89°10′15″W	
Whitewater Lake (Bass Lake, Kettle Lake)	Walworth	625	35	42°45′26″N 88°41′46″W	
Dells Pond	Eau Claire	622	30	44°49′29″N 91°29′48″W	
Alexander Lake	Lincoln	618	36	45°11′13″N 89°45′26″W	
Crescent Lake	Oneida	616	32	45°35′55″N 89°31′04″W	
Smoky Lake	Vilas (Iron, Michigan)	612	60	46°05′11″N 88°56′53″W	
Big Stone Lake	Oneida	607	57	45°48′11″N 89°06′06″W	
Neshonoc Lake	La Crosse	606	11	43°54′31″N 91°03′24″W	
Apple River Flowage	Polk	604	18	45°22′26″N 92°21′52″W	
Long Lake	Oneida	604	31	45°52′07″N 89°08′36″W	
Otter Lake (Brown Lake)	Chippewa	602	43	45°04′16″N 90°56′34″W	
Lac Sault Dore (Soo Lake)	Price	601	21	45°42′12″N 90°33′44″W	
Spirit Lake	Burnett	592	27	45°42′47″N 92°33′07″W	
Big Portage Lake	Vilas	586	40	46°07′32″N 89°17′06″W	
Pickerel Lake	Oneida	581	17	45°53′09″N 89°31′49″W	
Day Lake	Ashland	578	20	46°11′15″N 90°54′23″W	
Eagle Lake	Vilas	575	34	45°55′56″N 89°12′29″W	
Twin Falls Flowage	Florence	570	50	45°52′25″N 88°04′16″W	
Mud Hen Lake	Burnett	569	66	45°46′38″N 92°28′53″W	
Black Oak Lake	Vilas	564	85	46°09′47″N 89°18′58″W	
Lake Maria	Green Lake	563	6	43°38′51″N 89°00′06″W	
Garden Lake	Bayfield	558	23	46°12′30″N 91°03′31″W	
Rynearson Flowage Number 1 Pool	Juneau	555	14	44°03′32″N 90°09′30″W	
Half Moon Lake	Polk	550	60	45°29′41″N 92°25′14″W	
Sand Lake	Oneida	547	25	45°50′57″N 89°23′27″W	
Rice Lake	Sawyer	544	24	45°55′10″N 91°14′21″W	Not included in the WIDNR list of lakes.
Island Lake	Rusk	543	54	45°19′11″N 91°23′03″W	
Potato Lake	Rusk	540	40	45°19′24″N 91°25′58″W	
Lost Lake	Vilas	539	20	45°57′56″N 89°28′59″W	
Totagatic Lake	Bayfield	538	7	46°10′05″N 91°24′11″W	
Harris Lake	Vilas	534	57	46°15′38″N 89°50′03″W	
Eagle Lake	Racine	529	11	42°42′12″N 88°07′31″W	
Middle McKenzie Lake	Burnett, Washburn	527	45	45°56′35″N 92°02′27″W	
Crystal Lake	Columbia, Dane	525	9	43°17′25″N 89°37′23″W	
Katherine Lake	Oneida	524	30	45°48′17″N 89°42′43″W	
Oxbow Lake	Vilas	523	44	46°14′38″N 89°40′45″W	
Stormy Lake	Vilas	523	63	46°03′19″N 89°19′18″W	
Wood Lake	Burnett	521	35	45°44′28″N 92°34′55″W	
Sugar Camp Lake	Oneida	519	38	45°47′46″N 89°18′25″W	
Gull Lake	Washburn	518	19	45°59′44″N 91°45′08″W	
Sevenmile Lake	Forest, Oneida	518	43	45°52′48″N 89°03′06″W	
Boulder Lake	Vilas	516	23	46°07′29″N 89°39′41″W	
Silver Lake	Kenosha	516	44	42°33′03″N 88°09′14″W	
Clear Lake	Vilas	515	45	46°08′50″N 89°48′42″W	
Wabikon Lake	Forest	513	15	45°33′05″N 88°46′46″W	
Enterprise Lake	Langlade	509	27	45°27′17″N 89°14′20″W	
Birch Lake	Vilas	506	45	46°13′04″N 89°50′18″W	
Halsey Lake	Florence	506	10	45°50′53″N 88°37′58″W	
Wisconsin Rapids Flowage	Wood	504	22	44°24′29″N 89°48′42″W	
Ballard Lake	Vilas	503	25	46°03′39″N 89°29′55″W	
Musser Flowage	Price	503	15	45°43′53″N 90°15′48″W	
Windigo Lake (Bass Lake)	Sawyer	503	51	45°55′51″N 91°28′18″W	
Manitowish Lake	Vilas	496	61	46°06′27″N 89°50′27″W	
Nepco Lake	Wood	496	29	44°20′14″N 89°49′57″W	
Upper Buckatabon Lake	Vilas	493	47	46°00′59″N 89°20′51″W	
Kingsford Flowage	Florence	491	32	45°48′35″N 88°07′48″W	
Bogbrook Impoundment	Forest	490	6	45°23′15″N 88°49′14″W	
Stone Lake	Washburn	490	49	45°50′36″N 91°33′23″W	
Nekoosa Flowage	Wood	486	17	44°18′46″N 89°53′30″W	
Little Arbor Vitae Lake	Vilas	480	32	45°54′44″N 89°37′21″W	
Little Muskego Lake	Waukesha	470	65	42°54′50″N 88°08′35″W	
North Nokomis Lake (Swamp Lake)	Oneida	470	73	45°51′07″N 89°27′05″W	
Old Abe Lake	Chippewa	470	36	45°04′13″N 91°15′18″W	
Forest Lake (Goose Lake)	Vilas	468	60	46°08′56″N 89°22′34″W	
Birch Lake	Forest	466	75	45°34′09″N 88°38′17″W	
Cranberry Lake	Price	466	18	45°37′08″N 90°21′10″W	
South Turtle Lake	Vilas	466	40	46°12′41″N 89°53′41″W	
Pokegama Lake	Washburn	465	23	46°05′38″N 91°52′29″W	
Mud Lake	Sawyer	464	15	45°59′50″N 91°14′52″W	
Little Green Lake	Green Lake	462	28	43°44′13″N 88°59′04″W	
Moen Lake (Moens Lake)	Oneida	461	11	45°39′49″N 89°18′48″W	
Pike Lake	Washington	461	45	43°18′39″N 88°19′58″W	
Dead Slough Lake	Pierce	458	25	44°34′27″N 92°29′43″W	
Chain Lake	Chippewa, Rusk	454	74	45°17′52″N 91°25′48″W	
Totagatic Flowage	Sawyer, Washburn	453	12	46°06′42″N 91°32′07″W	
Yellowstone Lake	Lafayette	453	14	42°45′51″N 89°58′26″W	
Powers Lake	Kenosha, Walworth	451	33	42°32′47″N 88°17′53″W	
Lake Minnesuing	Douglas	450	43	46°28′03″N 91°44′42″W	
Rome Pond	Jefferson	448	7	42°58′47″N 88°36′36″W	
Townsend Flowage (Wheeler Lake)	Oconto	446	30	45°19′40″N 88°35′59″W	
Berkhahn Flowage (Townline Flowage)	Marathon	445	12	44°42′24″N 89°50′12″W	
George Lake	Oneida	443	26	45°36′32″N 89°19′58″W	
Lac du Lune (Island Lake)	Vilas	442	68	46°07′46″N 89°23′07″W	
Blue Lake (Rusk Lake)	Oneida	441	49	45°50′21″N 89°45′29″W	
Fisher Lake	Iron	441	21	46°14′35″N 89°57′48″W	
Marsh-Miller Lake (Mill Pond)	Chippewa	441	14	45°08′56″N 91°23′29″W	
North Lake	Waukesha	440	78	43°09′01″N 88°22′55″W	
Camp Lake	Kenosha	439	19	42°31′16″N 88°08′39″W	
Meadow Valley Flowage	Juneau	439	8	44°13′19″N 90°14′43″W	
Tenderfoot Lake	Vilas (Gogebic, Michigan)	437	33	46°13′04″N 89°31′46″W	
Machickanee Flowage (Stiles Lake)	Oconto	436	21	44°51′15″N 88°04′13″W	
Roberts Lake	Forest	435	31	45°27′24″N 88°47′20″W	
Rynearson Flowage Number 2 Pool	Juneau	434		44°04′08″N 90°10′53″W	
Chute Pond	Oconto	433	19	45°07′43″N 88°26′57″W	
Pokegama Lake	Barron	433	19	45°19′36″N 91°38′00″W	
Crane Lake	Sawyer	432	33	45°57′49″N 91°16′30″W	Not included in the WIDNR list of lakes.
Pioneer Lake	Vilas	429	27	46°01′01″N 89°12′22″W	
Scattered Rice Lake	Forest	428	10	45°34′07″N 88°41′07″W	
Upper Turtle Lake	Barron	427	25	45°25′21″N 92°05′55″W	
Jersey City Flowage	Lincoln	423	20	45°30′14″N 89°44′20″W	
Long Lake	Fond du Lac, Sheboygan	423	47	43°40′26″N 88°10′14″W	
Papoose Lake	Vilas	422	65	46°11′05″N 89°48′10″W	
Scott Lake	Sawyer	422	25	45°54′46″N 91°12′31″W	Not included in the WIDNR list of lakes.
Deer Lake	Sawyer	420	18	45°39′00″N 91°23′16″W	
Lake Ripley	Jefferson	420	44	43°00′03″N 88°59′30″W	
Bridge Lake	Lincoln, Oneida	419	15	45°32′45″N 89°41′00″W	
Irving Lake	Vilas	419	8	46°03′41″N 89°28′25″W	
Long Lake	Price	419	54	45°41′36″N 90°26′02″W	
Rosebush Lake	Marinette	417	30	45°29′43″N 87°47′45″W	
West Bay Lake	Vilas (Gogebic, Michigan)	417	31	46°12′15″N 89°25′34″W	
Stella Lake	Oneida	415	22	45°42′50″N 89°11′39″W	
Indianhead Flowage	Polk	413	57	45°27′27″N 92°39′45″W	
Reservoir Pond	Oconto	413	16	45°18′44″N 88°38′22″W	
Mondeaux Flowage	Taylor	411	10	45°18′25″N 90°26′05″W	
Connors Lake	Sawyer	410	82	45°45′07″N 90°44′11″W	
Willow Lake	Oneida	410	6	45°42′57″N 89°59′54″W	
Swan Lake	Columbia	407	82	43°32′42″N 89°21′54″W	
Allequash Lake	Vilas	406	24	46°02′13″N 89°37′44″W	
Riecks Lake	Buffalo	406	16	44°21′08″N 91°55′39″W	
Julia Lake	Forest, Oneida	404	45	45°47′44″N 89°02′35″W	
Somo Lake	Lincoln	404	25	45°31′09″N 89°52′16″W	
Bearskin Lake	Oneida	403	26	45°43′56″N 89°40′57″W	
Wolf Lake	Vilas	403	28	46°09′34″N 89°39′52″W	
Lake Thompson	Oneida	401	30	45°38′02″N 89°19′49″W	
Johnson Lake	Burnett	399	23	45°56′27″N 92°18′46″W	
Christie Lake (Christy Lake)	Oconto	398	10	44°53′25″N 88°21′45″W	
Horseshoe Lake	Barron, Polk	398	57	45°26′35″N 92°09′32″W	
Squash Lake	Oneida	398	74	45°35′27″N 89°32′54″W	
Browns Lake	Racine	397	44	42°41′16″N 88°14′33″W	
Medicine Lake	Oneida	396	45	45°48′50″N 89°07′34″W	
Townline Reservoir	Marathon, Portage	395	10	44°41′30″N 89°48′58″W	
Big Crooked Lake	Vilas	394	87	46°02′06″N 89°51′32″W	
Camelot Lake	Adams	393	24	44°13′37″N 89°45′53″W	
Lipsett Lake (Lipsie Lake)	Burnett	393	24	45°52′21″N 92°02′57″W	
Archibald Lake	Oconto	392	50	45°16′59″N 88°35′12″W	
Amnicon Lake	Douglas	390	31	46°28′40″N 92°03′40″W	
Spring Lake	Buffalo	390	27	44°11′20″N 91°50′10″W	
Big Butternut Lake	Polk	384	19	45°34′16″N 92°27′34″W	
Ghost Lake	Sawyer	384	12	46°05′30″N 91°03′16″W	
Wild Rice Lake (Half Way Lake)	Vilas	384	26	46°03′55″N 89°47′49″W	
Trego Lake	Washburn	383	36	45°55′29″N 91°51′46″W	
Razorback Lake	Vilas	381	35	46°01′10″N 89°31′12″W	
Round Lake	La Crosse	381	8	43°51′24″N 91°16′53″W	
Long Interlaken Lake (Long Lake)	Vilas	380	65	45°57′36″N 89°54′04″W	
Lower Post Lake	Langlade	379	9	45°24′55″N 89°05′21″W	
Lake Columbia	Columbia	378	8	43°28′15″N 89°25′21″W	
Lower Buckatabon Lake	Vilas	378	16	46°01′33″N 89°19′17″W	
Anvil Lake	Vilas	377	32	45°56′36″N 89°03′50″W	
Horsehead Lake (Leta Lake)	Oneida	377	11	45°47′05″N 89°35′12″W	
Devil's Lake	Sauk	374	47	43°25′02″N 89°43′54″W	
Lower Phantom Lake (Howitt Lake)	Waukesha	373	12	42°51′17″N 88°20′52″W	
Gilmore Lake	Washburn	371	36	46°07′22″N 91°53′16″W	
Bass Lake	St. Croix	370	33	45°04′02″N 92°38′56″W	
Boulder Lake	Langlade, Oconto	370	11	45°08′56″N 88°38′08″W	
Long Lake	Iron	370	34	46°15′35″N 90°01′34″W	
Lyman Lake	Douglas	370	15	46°27′24″N 91°59′02″W	
Teal Flowage	Marathon	370	13	44°43′22″N 89°52′50″W	
Kelly Lake	Oconto	367	41	45°01′18″N 88°13′36″W	
Lower Clam Lake	Burnett	366	14	45°49′35″N 92°19′19″W	
Boom Lake	Oneida	365	30	45°39′20″N 89°25′00″W	
Birch Lake	Sawyer, Washburn	364	73	45°40′08″N 91°32′38″W	
Hemlock Lake	Barron	364	21	45°34′05″N 91°33′53″W	
Upper Gresham Lake	Vilas	362	32	46°04′04″N 89°44′13″W	
Clearwater Lake	Oneida, Vilas	360	48	45°51′02″N 89°12′01″W	
Lake Eau Galle	Dunn	360	18	44°42′36″N 92°00′54″W	
Clam River Flowage	Burnett	359	29	45°55′38″N 92°31′06″W	
North Turtle Lake	Vilas	359	58	46°14′16″N 89°53′04″W	
Spider Lake (Whispering Pines Lake)	Iron	359	49	46°12′32″N 90°01′41″W	
Crane Lake	Forest	355	25	45°24′42″N 88°53′32″W	
Crowley Flowage 802	Price	354	23	45°52′09″N 90°32′39″W	
Indian Lake	Oneida	354	26	45°48′50″N 89°18′06″W	
Long Lake	Florence, Forest	353	21	45°50′20″N 88°40′32″W	
Duroy Lake	Price	350	18	45°41′36″N 90°23′18″W	
Eagle Nest Flowage (Potters Lake)	Juneau	350	12	44°04′41″N 90°15′49″W	
Spirit Lake	Oneida	348	39	45°47′59″N 89°08′04″W	
Wilson Lake	Price	348	11	45°40′11″N 90°27′23″W	
Mackaysee Lake	Door	347	27	45°11′36″N 87°20′38″W	
Cranberry Creek Flowage	Douglas	346	6	46°27′06″N 91°56′57″W	
Island Lake	Iron	344	17	46°15′51″N 90°18′10″W	
Mullet Marsh 15 Reservoir	Fond du Lac	344		43°44′39″N 88°12′08″W	
Red Cedar Lake	Jefferson	344	6	42°58′53″N 88°59′01″W	
Blaisdell Lake	Sawyer	341	19	45°56′20″N 90°53′41″W	
Lake Montello	Marquette	341	17	43°48′13″N 89°20′25″W	
North Honey Island Flowage	Marathon	340	7	44°42′47″N 89°53′07″W	
Staples Lake	Barron, Polk	340	17	45°29′51″N 92°09′03″W	
Carpenter Lake	Vilas	339	16	45°56′38″N 89°08′52″W	
Fishtrap Lake	Vilas	339	34	46°08′27″N 89°34′55″W	
Mamie Lake	Vilas (Gogebic, Michigan)	337	15	46°11′25″N 89°23′34″W	
Found Lake	Vilas	336	21	45°57′02″N 89°27′12″W	
Lake Wingra	Dane	336	14	43°03′13″N 89°25′10″W	
Little Fork Lake	Oneida	336	34	45°49′44″N 89°06′59″W	
Little Yellow Lake	Burnett	332	21	45°55′45″N 92°25′51″W	
Mud Lake	Barron	332	15	45°21′50″N 91°39′12″W	
Silver Lake	Barron	331	91	45°35′02″N 91°55′16″W	
Carrol Lake	Oneida, Vilas	330	27	45°53′36″N 89°37′35″W	
Fish Lake	Burnett	330	29	45°58′21″N 92°07′02″W	
Park Lake	Columbia	330	27	43°32′49″N 89°17′15″W	
Long Lake	Burnett	329	13	45°45′57″N 92°21′40″W	
Rice Lake	Burnett	329	9	45°51′56″N 92°04′36″W	
Rooney Lake	Burnett	329	30	45°57′39″N 92°04′28″W	
Armour Lake	Vilas	328	56	46°13′16″N 89°43′10″W	
Silver Lake	Waushara	328	50	44°03′17″N 89°14′02″W	
Big Trade Lake (Little Trade Lake)	Burnett	327	39	45°40′13″N 92°37′01″W	
Lake Mary (Marie Lake)	Kenosha	327	33	42°31′25″N 88°15′22″W	
Loon Lake	Shawano	327	22	44°50′01″N 88°30′38″W	
Smith Lake	Sawyer	326	29	46°03′42″N 91°29′51″W	
Balsam Lake	Washburn	325	49	45°38′42″N 91°34′39″W	
Little Quinnesec Falls Flowage	Marinette	323	40	45°47′31″N 88°00′35″W	
Diamond Lake	Bayfield	322	83	46°15′46″N 91°08′43″W	
Sand Lake	Barron	318	57	45°35′26″N 92°06′29″W	
Silver Lake	Forest	317	20	45°33′26″N 88°42′26″W	
Tainter Lake 1667	Dunn	317	31	44°55′09″N 91°52′58″W	
Decorah Lake	Juneau	314	15	43°48′26″N 90°05′06″W	
Gilmore Lake	Oneida	314	24	45°51′21″N 89°33′34″W	
Beaver Lake	Waukesha	313	46	43°07′44″N 88°21′38″W	
Ham Lake	Burnett	313	29	45°57′58″N 92°16′06″W	
Green Lake	Walworth	311	57	42°46′44″N 88°34′13″W	Part of the Lauderdale Lakes
Moyle Lake	Price	311	12	45°36′16″N 90°12′30″W	
Mead Lake	Clark	310	16	44°47′24″N 90°45′26″W	
North Fork Flowage	Burnett	310		45°50′07″N 92°35′23″W	
Upper Park Falls Flowage	Ashland, Price	310	17	45°58′13″N 90°24′46″W	
Dead Pike Lake	Vilas	309	80	46°06′10″N 89°53′56″W	
Little Sissabagama Lake	Sawyer	308	75	45°45′35″N 91°31′19″W	
Grand Rapids Flowage	Marinette	307	21	45°22′16″N 87°39′40″W	
Hasbrook Lake	Oneida	307	50	45°50′15″N 89°34′57″W	
Lynx Lake	Vilas	307	48	46°11′57″N 89°40′20″W	
Hiles Millpond	Forest	306	5	45°43′34″N 88°58′05″W	
Island Lake	Oneida	305	26	45°49′44″N 89°08′00″W	
Escanaba Lake (Rock Lake)	Vilas	303	26	46°03′51″N 89°35′09″W	
Deerskin Lake	Vilas	301	18	45°58′32″N 89°10′09″W	
Moshawquit Lake	Menominee	301	30	44°53′50″N 88°30′02″W	
Rib Lake	Taylor	301	9	45°18′52″N 90°11′52″W	
Pine Lake	Iron	300	41	46°15′40″N 90°08′22″W	
Brule Lake (Brule River Flowage)	Florence (Iron, Michigan)	297	64	45°56′47″N 88°13′06″W	
Europe Lake	Door	297	10	45°16′21″N 86°59′11″W	
Lake of the Falls	Iron	297	23	46°09′45″N 90°10′16″W	
Bear Lake	Oneida	295	20	45°45′56″N 89°48′06″W	
Hat Rapids Flowage	Oneida	295	19	45°34′17″N 89°28′51″W	
Lake Arrowhead	Adams	295	30	44°12′35″N 89°50′29″W	
Killarney Lake	Oneida	293	8	45°35′43″N 89°48′46″W	
Pipe Lake	Polk	293	68	45°30′54″N 92°12′34″W	
Swamp Lake	Oneida	293	8	45°38′15″N 89°47′15″W	
Wildcat Lake	Vilas	293	38	46°10′22″N 89°37′01″W	
Blueberry Lake	Sawyer	292	29	45°52′53″N 91°15′04″W	
Elkhart Lake (Big Elkhart Lake)	Sheboygan	292	119	43°49′34″N 88°01′30″W	
Fireside Lakes	Rusk	292	29	45°19′14″N 91°19′43″W	Two lakes collectively known as Fireside Lakes (areas/max depths of 211/29, 81/14)
Cranberry Lake	Sawyer	291	25	45°55′13″N 91°06′39″W	Not included in the WIDNR list of lakes.
Crystal Lake	Douglas	291	22	46°11′16″N 91°57′05″W	
Irogami Lake (Fish Lake)	Waushara	290	5	44°03′57″N 89°13′57″W	
Stevens Lake	Forest	290	12	45°55′34″N 88°42′10″W	
Lake Mallalieu	St. Croix	289	17	44°59′24″N 92°44′37″W	
Nicaboyne Lake (Nicahoyne Lake)	Burnett	289	34	45°59′11″N 92°04′49″W	
Bishop Lake	Forest	288	12	45°29′16″N 89°00′51″W	
Golden Lake	Jefferson, Waukesha	288	44	43°02′06″N 88°32′12″W	
Dexter Lake	Wood	287	17	44°23′14″N 90°07′12″W	
Muskellunge Lake	Oneida	287	24	45°47′59″N 89°28′46″W	
Boot Lake	Vilas	286	15	45°58′07″N 89°19′33″W	
Lower Turtle Lake	Barron	286	24	45°23′19″N 92°04′35″W	
Marais Lake	Crawford	285	15	43°05′25″N 91°09′46″W	
Port Arthur Flowage	Rusk	285	19	45°26′38″N 91°07′30″W	
Siskiwit Lake	Bayfield	285	13	46°47′43″N 91°08′00″W	
Merrill Flowage (2780 Reservoir)	Lincoln	284	11	45°10′42″N 89°41′18″W	
Amacoy Lake	Rusk	283	20	45°23′55″N 91°18′53″W	
Big Falls Flowage	Rusk	281	45	45°34′11″N 90°57′08″W	
Wheeler Lake	Oconto	281	35	45°19′08″N 88°28′34″W	
Long Lake	Bayfield	280	28	46°34′55″N 91°20′37″W	
Bond Lake	Douglas	279	67	46°11′00″N 91°52′28″W	
Eagle Spring Lake	Walworth, Waukesha	279	8	42°51′07″N 88°26′28″W	
Lost Canoe Lake	Vilas	279	41	46°04′33″N 89°35′42″W	
Summit Lake	Langlade	279	29	45°22′28″N 89°12′26″W	
Tichigan Lake	Racine	279	63	42°48′57″N 88°12′30″W	
Hilbert Lake (Orwig Lake)	Forest, Marinette	278	32	45°42′32″N 88°24′57″W	
Spider Lake	Vilas	278	43	46°07′16″N 89°49′24″W	
Upper Nemahbin Lake	Waukesha	277	60	43°03′58″N 88°25′51″W	
Partridge Crop Lake	Waupaca	276	8	44°20′56″N 88°51′40″W	
Upper North Fork Flowage	Burnett	276		45°51′45″N 92°33′08″W	
Centralia Flowage	Wood	274	19	44°22′03″N 89°51′26″W	
Chippewa Lake	Bayfield	274	11	46°11′59″N 90°59′02″W	
Lake of the Pines (Pickerel Lake)	Sawyer	273	39	45°46′17″N 90°42′56″W	
Long Lake	Polk	273	17	45°27′14″N 92°30′48″W	
Mud Lake (Upper Lake)	Pierce	273	17	44°34′41″N 92°32′08″W	
Spider Lake	Washburn	273	49	45°42′25″N 91°35′16″W	
Bass Lake (Salsich Lake)	Vilas	272	15	45°55′27″N 89°08′16″W	
Fay Lake	Florence	272	10	45°52′02″N 88°38′15″W	
Sand Lake	Chippewa, Rusk	272	100	45°17′49″N 91°21′29″W	
Skice Lake	Menominee	272	36	44°53′26″N 88°35′55″W	
Mill Lake	Walworth	271	40	42°45′33″N 88°33′49″W	Part of the Lauderdale Lakes
Muskellunge Lake	Vilas	270	19	45°57′06″N 89°22′48″W	
Pickerel Lake	Vilas	270	26	45°58′28″N 89°23′42″W	
Maiden Lake	Oconto	269	52	45°16′09″N 88°32′10″W	
Ladysmith Flowage	Rusk	268	19	45°29′03″N 91°04′34″W	
Lake Emily	Dodge	268	10	43°37′38″N 88°58′08″W	
Matthews Lake	Washburn	267	26	46°01′25″N 91°57′27″W	
Tenmile Lake	Barron	266	12	45°17′34″N 91°36′53″W	
Thornapple Flowage	Rusk	266	19	45°25′01″N 91°11′25″W	
Viola Lake	Burnett	265	34	45°49′04″N 92°15′05″W	
Alder Lake	Vilas	264	30	46°05′17″N 89°49′11″W	
Gunlock Lake	Vilas	264	26	45°54′46″N 89°49′12″W	
Fishtrap Lake	Sawyer	263	11	45°57′06″N 90°57′07″W	
Monroe County Flowage	Monroe	263	8	44°04′38″N 90°22′12″W	
Scattering Rice Lake	Vilas	263	17	45°56′24″N 89°11′14″W	
Pier Lake	Oneida	262	15	45°43′23″N 89°58′50″W	
Spring Lake	Douglas	261	8	46°29′50″N 91°36′00″W	
Virgin Lake	Oneida	261	31	45°47′06″N 89°05′14″W	
Little Cedar Lake	Washington	260	56	43°22′34″N 88°13′40″W	
Little Star Lake	Vilas	260	67	46°06′55″N 89°51′41″W	
Pokegama Lake	Sawyer	260	39	45°54′17″N 91°10′09″W	Not included in the WIDNR list of lakes.
Clear Lake	Lincoln	259	45	45°31′56″N 89°43′21″W	
Hancock Lake	Oneida	259	22	45°37′07″N 89°37′51″W	
Middle Lake	Walworth	259	40	42°46′12″N 88°34′11″W	Part of the Lauderdale Lakes
Hart Lake (Heart Lake, Wiehe Lake)	Bayfield	257	54	46°31′07″N 91°21′43″W	
Benoit Lake	Burnett	256	41	45°53′13″N 92°05′27″W	
Lost Lake	Burnett	256	4	46°00′26″N 92°04′42″W	
Pine Lake	Chippewa, Rusk	256	106	45°17′33″N 91°27′32″W	
Mercer Lake	Oneida	255	23	45°52′07″N 89°48′41″W	
North Lake (Holden Lake)	Walworth	255	11	42°44′43″N 88°38′11″W	
Oneida Lake	Oneida	255	34	45°37′54″N 89°37′40″W	
Potter Flowage	Jackson	255	24	44°18′07″N 90°30′59″W	
Sturgeon Falls Flowage	Marinette	255	23	45°44′29″N 87°51′50″W	
Long Lake	Waushara	254	71	44°12′59″N 89°07′30″W	
Middle Sugarbush Lake	Vilas	254	57	46°01′36″N 89°53′54″W	
Patten Lake	Florence	254	52	45°51′15″N 88°25′11″W	
Fourth Lake (North Pelican Lake)	Oneida	253	14	45°38′12″N 89°16′28″W	
Mann Lake	Vilas	253	18	45°59′33″N 89°39′22″W	
Red Lake	Douglas	253	37	46°10′46″N 91°45′52″W	
Sportsman Lake	Clark	253	12	44°58′54″N 90°34′09″W	
Weyauwega Lake	Waupaca	253	10	44°19′28″N 88°56′49″W	
Island Lake	Washburn	252	44	45°57′30″N 91°56′35″W	
Sapokesick Lake	Menominee	252	35	44°54′08″N 88°32′14″W	
Green Lake	Burnett	251	6	45°54′40″N 92°11′35″W	
Clear Lake	Sawyer	250	25	46°05′45″N 91°14′14″W	
Crooked Lake	Burnett	250	13	45°57′42″N 92°17′05″W	
Grassy Lake	Columbia	250		43°25′27″N 89°10′11″W	
Horsehead Lake	Vilas	250	24	46°14′00″N 89°42′55″W	
Moose Lake	Iron	250	12	46°13′55″N 90°13′19″W	
Grettum Flowage (Canute Creek Flowage)	Burnett	249		45°42′36″N 92°41′33″W	
Lake Delton	Sauk	249	16	43°36′00″N 89°46′44″W	
Laurel Lake (Medicine Lake)	Oneida	249	27	45°48′32″N 89°06′59″W	
Stone Lake	Oneida	249	14	45°49′48″N 89°58′23″W	
Swamp Lake	Sawyer	249	8	45°47′47″N 90°42′00″W	
Bear Trap Lake	Polk	247	25	45°18′46″N 92°24′37″W	
Iron Lake	Bayfield	247	20	46°32′01″N 91°26′32″W	
Lost Lake	Dodge	247	8	43°26′37″N 88°58′12″W	
McDill Pond	Portage	247	19	44°29′52″N 89°32′53″W	
Lotus Lake (East Lake)	Polk	246	15	45°20′10″N 92°35′45″W	
Bagley Flowage 1061	Marinette	245	20	45°06′55″N 87°45′45″W	
Big Lake	Polk	245	24	45°17′45″N 92°32′20″W	
Lake Tomah	Monroe	245	19	43°58′54″N 90°31′23″W	
Greater Bass Lake	Langlade	244	25	45°21′29″N 89°11′38″W	
Sanborn Lake	Vilas	243	13	46°11′59″N 89°32′49″W	
Danbury Flowage	Burnett	242	10	45°56′56″N 92°24′14″W	
Grand Lake (Millpond Lake)	Green Lake	242	8	43°41′22″N 89°07′19″W	
McGregor Lake	Crawford	242	13	43°02′09″N 91°09′50″W	
Pine Lake	Oneida	242	32	45°43′18″N 89°22′19″W	
South Bay	Vilas	242	22	45°54′26″N 89°27′12″W	Not included in the WIDNR list of lakes.
Blockhouse Lake	Price	241	8	45°57′27″N 90°20′15″W	
Lake Julia	Oneida	241	19	45°36′50″N 89°25′49″W	
13 Reservoir	Wood	240		44°18′03″N 90°00′40″W	
Casey Lake	Washburn	240	27	45°56′37″N 91°58′05″W	
Lower Red Lake (Weed Dam Pond)	Shawano	240	28	44°51′03″N 88°46′21″W	
Lake Content	Vilas	239	14	45°55′16″N 89°30′41″W	
Lower Nemahbin Lake	Waukesha	239	36	43°02′53″N 88°26′04″W	
South Refuge Flowage	Burnett	239		45°50′57″N 92°37′21″W	
Fifth Lake (North Pelican Lake)	Oneida	238	9	45°38′22″N 89°15′20″W	
Leigh Flowage	Oconto	238	52	45°02′37″N 88°13′59″W	
Long Lake	Price	238	49	45°48′57″N 90°39′53″W	
Jennie Webber Lake	Oneida	237	8	45°44′24″N 89°19′52″W	
Little Sand Lake	Forest, Langlade	237	20	45°28′12″N 88°55′09″W	
North Flowage	Monroe	237	17	44°08′26″N 90°40′31″W	
South Gallagher Flowage	Wood	237	6	44°20′56″N 90°10′50″W	
Big Bateau Lake	Vilas (Gogebic, Michigan)	236	36	46°10′50″N 89°17′01″W	
Little Tamarack Flowage	Vilas	236	16	46°05′02″N 89°20′56″W	
Manson Lake	Oneida	236	54	45°33′45″N 89°37′59″W	
White Clay Lake	Shawano	236	46	44°48′03″N 88°24′17″W	
Lake Keesus	Waukesha	235	42	43°09′57″N 88°18′59″W	
Partridge Lake	Vilas	235	19	46°04′48″N 89°30′21″W	
Coleman Lake	Marinette	234	67	45°36′35″N 88°16′08″W	
Elbow Lake	Burnett, Polk	234	8	45°44′20″N 92°23′59″W	
Jordan Lake (Long Lake)	Adams	233	92	43°44′35″N 89°38′50″W	
Shoal Lake	Burnett	233	5	45°57′27″N 92°11′20″W	
English Lake	Ashland	232	40	46°18′46″N 90°46′06″W	
Peshtigo Flowage	Marinette	232	15	45°03′16″N 87°44′53″W	
Stearns Lake	Vilas	232	16	45°59′07″N 89°48′11″W	
Dunham Lake	Burnett	231	63	45°45′23″N 92°28′19″W	
Boot Lake	Oconto	230	38	45°16′01″N 88°38′02″W	
No Mans Lake	Vilas	230	31	46°17′01″N 89°53′53″W	
Van Vliet Lake	Vilas	230	20	46°11′35″N 89°45′27″W	
Magnor Lake (Richardson Lake)	Polk	229	26	45°19′22″N 92°12′18″W	
Wisconsin River Flowage Number 2	Portage	228	25	44°29′41″N 89°35′22″W	
Emma Lake	Oneida	227	17	45°35′24″N 89°29′58″W	
Mineral Lake	Ashland	227	29	46°17′40″N 90°49′42″W	
Whitney Lake (Harrington Lake)	Vilas	226	8	46°07′06″N 89°44′05″W	
Plum Lake	Vilas (Gogebic, Michigan)	225		46°13′17″N 89°30′16″W	
Tyner Lake	Sawyer	225	25	45°55′01″N 91°16′09″W	Not included in the WIDNR list of lakes.
North Spirit Lake	Price, Taylor	224	22	45°23′03″N 90°09′09″W	
Pokegama Lake	Burnett	224	28	45°46′53″N 92°11′58″W	
Potato Lake	Washburn	224	20	45°49′13″N 91°40′19″W	
Little Spider Lake (Gaffrey Lake)	Vilas	223	23	45°58′16″N 89°42′30″W	
Bass Lake	Burnett	222	6	45°57′06″N 92°25′29″W	
Lea Flowage (Lea Lake)	Rusk	222	9	45°36′47″N 91°04′27″W	
Long Lake	Burnett	222	41	45°59′27″N 92°07′49″W	
Minerva Lake	Burnett	222	26	45°59′17″N 92°19′35″W	
Horse Lake	Polk	221	11	45°19′14″N 92°34′17″W	
Little Lac Courte Oreilles	Sawyer	221	46	45°53′06″N 91°23′36″W	
McCullough Lake	Vilas	221	27	46°11′54″N 89°34′14″W	
Mid Lake (Nawaii Lake)	Oneida	221	12	45°51′28″N 89°39′49″W	
South Two Lakes	Oneida	221	69	45°46′36″N 89°36′49″W	
Iola Lake (Iola Millpond)	Waupaca	220	9	44°31′20″N 89°07′56″W	
Riley Lake	Forest	220	20	45°32′15″N 88°46′44″W	
Garnet Lake	Crawford	219	14	43°00′42″N 91°08′56″W	Not included in the WIDNR list of lakes.
Plummer Lake	Vilas	219	85	45°58′10″N 89°46′33″W	
Circle Lily Lake	Iron, Vilas	218	35	46°09′33″N 89°55′09″W	
Twentysix Lake	Burnett	218	45	46°00′25″N 92°13′05″W	
Upper Mud Lake	Dane	218	8	43°02′18″N 89°18′59″W	
Big Roche a Cri Lake	Adams	217	20	44°03′29″N 89°48′56″W	
Half Moon Lake	Marathon	217	11	44°48′35″N 89°41′53″W	
Lawrence Lake	Marquette	217	14	43°53′20″N 89°33′46″W	
Lily Lake	Forest	217	24	45°25′42″N 88°50′14″W	
Pine Lake	Shawano	217	35	44°41′11″N 88°39′30″W	
Silver Lake	Waukesha	217	40	43°04′36″N 88°29′35″W	
Lake Sherwood	Adams	216	27	44°12′11″N 89°47′29″W	
Round Lake	Chippewa	216	18	45°15′15″N 91°27′03″W	
Sand Lake	Polk	216	58	45°22′22″N 92°33′38″W	
Snipe Lake	Vilas	216	15	45°56′23″N 89°21′55″W	
Des Moines Lake (Sucker Lake)	Burnett	215	37	45°59′48″N 92°08′06″W	
Lower Vermillion Lake	Barron	215	55	45°30′46″N 91°57′41″W	
Clear Lake (Near Lake)	Oneida, Vilas	214	23	45°53′27″N 89°57′36″W	
Kathan Lake	Oneida	214	15	45°52′18″N 89°19′06″W	
Lower Clam Lake	Sawyer	214	30	46°08′19″N 90°56′32″W	
Osprey Lake	Sawyer	214	32	45°58′42″N 91°17′57″W	
Pike Lake	Iron	214	80	46°10′29″N 90°07′11″W	
Seventeen Flowage	Jackson	214	4	44°18′27″N 90°35′16″W	
Barker Lake	Sawyer	213	12	45°54′43″N 91°01′53″W	
Big Doctor Lake	Burnett	213	9	45°47′40″N 92°23′55″W	
Wolf River Pond 1139	Shawano	213	14	44°47′14″N 88°37′15″W	
Blackhawk Lake	Iowa	212	42	43°01′16″N 90°17′06″W	
Blom Lake (Bloom Lake)	Polk	212	13	45°43′12″N 92°29′15″W	
Gremore Lake (Courtois Pond Lake)	Crawford	212	15	43°05′48″N 91°09′17″W	
Lake Galilee	Ashland	212	23	46°17′03″N 90°35′35″W	
Lake Montanis	Barron	212	14	45°28′37″N 91°42′20″W	
Random Lake	Sheboygan	212	22	43°33′37″N 87°57′26″W	
Blacksmith Lake	Menominee	211	64	44°54′12″N 88°33′28″W	
Fourmile Lake	Oneida	210	29	45°50′49″N 89°04′53″W	
Sand Lake	Washburn	210	9	46°08′54″N 92°01′10″W	
Slim Lake	Washburn	210	42	45°47′52″N 91°33′32″W	
Berry Lake	Menominee, Oconto	209	27	44°53′21″N 88°28′45″W	
Big Carr Lake	Oneida	209	75	45°47′27″N 89°37′46″W	
Kettle Moraine Lake (Round Lake)	Fond du Lac	209	30	43°39′12″N 88°12′37″W	
Big Blake Lake (Beautiful Lake)	Polk	208	14	45°29′47″N 92°19′46″W	
Grandmother Flowage	Lincoln	208	22	45°22′48″N 89°43′21″W	
Neshkoro Millpond	Marquette, Waushara	208	9	43°58′01″N 89°13′50″W	
Round Lake	Burnett	208	27	45°39′42″N 92°34′44″W	
Love Lake	Burnett	207	63	45°58′24″N 92°19′44″W	
Pardee Lake	Iron, Vilas	207	27	46°16′45″N 89°55′54″W	
Rainbow Lake	Waupaca	207	95	44°20′31″N 89°09′00″W	Part of the Chain O' Lakes
Spring Lake	Vilas	207	12	46°10′33″N 89°21′22″W	
Star Lake	Bayfield	207	50	46°23′15″N 91°13′33″W	
Sunset Lake (Round Lake)	Vilas	207	30	45°55′36″N 89°20′18″W	
Apeekwa Lake (Little Pine Lake)	Vilas	206	5	45°58′06″N 90°02′06″W	
Lower McKenzie Lake	Burnett, Washburn	206	17	45°59′03″N 92°01′17″W	
Echo Lake	Iron	205	25	46°10′55″N 90°03′39″W	
Stateline Lake	Vilas (Gogebic, Michigan)	205	67	46°15′25″N 89°42′39″W	
Booth Lake	Oneida	204	34	45°53′22″N 89°54′53″W	
Evergreen Lake	Sawyer	204	25	45°48′44″N 90°41′21″W	
Pike Lake	Marathon	204	34	44°48′55″N 89°21′01″W	
Pine Lake	Oneida	204	24	45°49′29″N 89°55′26″W	
Spring Lake	Washburn	204	24	45°55′21″N 91°41′00″W	
Statenaker Lake	Vilas	204	77	45°58′57″N 89°46′29″W	
Landing Lake (Charlotte Lake)	Vilas	203	23	46°09′44″N 89°15′55″W	
Theresa Marsh Flowage (144 Reservoir)	Dodge	203		43°31′11″N 88°25′03″W	
Twin Island Lake	Vilas	203	15	46°13′29″N 89°35′33″W	
Dog Lake	Oneida	202	22	45°46′40″N 89°06′35″W	
Kieselhorse Bay	Buffalo	202	11	44°09′15″N 91°46′55″W	
Spring Lake	Sawyer	202	18	45°58′14″N 91°25′25″W	
Big Bass Lake	Washburn	201	27	46°04′36″N 91°54′02″W	
Chain Lake	Oneida	201	19	45°50′34″N 89°22′02″W	
Rice Lake	Forest	201	6	45°29′36″N 88°58′21″W	
Sailor Creek Flowage	Price	201	8	45°50′19″N 90°22′57″W	
Bear Lake	Waupaca	200	62	44°24′47″N 88°56′34″W	
Lake 7–8 22	Monroe	200	8	44°08′32″N 90°25′40″W	
Pigeon Lake	Bayfield	200	26	46°20′32″N 91°20′56″W	
Whitefish Lake	Vilas	200	40	45°54′33″N 89°51′22″W	
Alva Lake	Oneida	199	43	45°42′30″N 89°35′34″W	
Davis Flowage	Washburn	199	12	46°02′13″N 91°35′34″W	
Fish Lake	Dane	199	62	43°17′15″N 89°39′08″W	
Whitefish Lake	Oneida	199	33	45°46′42″N 89°04′09″W	
Birch Lake	Oneida	198	27	45°43′44″N 89°39′37″W	
Devils Lake	Sawyer	198	6	45°50′05″N 91°20′04″W	
Durphee Lake	Sawyer	198	16	45°54′17″N 91°27′33″W	
Lower Kaubashine Lake	Oneida	198	36	45°48′10″N 89°44′48″W	
Mason Lake	Sawyer	197	39	45°48′58″N 90°42′03″W	
Little Wood Lake	Burnett	196	23	45°44′50″N 92°32′14″W	
New Lisbon Lake	Juneau	196	15	43°53′08″N 90°09′46″W	
Keyes Lake	Florence	195	74	45°53′56″N 88°18′22″W	
North Gallagher Flowage	Wood	195		44°21′00″N 90°10′33″W	
Richmond Bay	La Crosse	195	15	43°50′42″N 91°15′30″W	
Upper Red Lake (Gresham Pond)	Shawano	195	15	44°51′39″N 88°48′01″W	
Annabelle Lake (Anna Lake)	Vilas	194	30	46°12′57″N 89°40′59″W	
Cornell Lake	Chippewa	194	39	45°07′04″N 91°20′17″W	
Harrison Lake	Lincoln	194	8	45°31′01″N 89°30′13″W	
Cherokee Lake	Dane	193	20	43°09′26″N 89°22′48″W	
Neopit Millpond	Menominee	193	10	44°59′02″N 88°50′50″W	
Bass Lake	Burnett	192	24	45°51′30″N 92°18′28″W	
Yellow Birch Lake	Vilas	192	23	45°56′04″N 89°14′16″W	
East Horsehead Lake	Oneida	191	27	45°42′01″N 89°36′40″W	
Jute Lake	Vilas	191	23	46°09′17″N 89°30′30″W	
Lake Hayward	Sawyer	191	17	46°00′29″N 91°28′11″W	
Loon Lake	Burnett	191	28	45°58′33″N 92°10′14″W	
Sweeny Lake	Oneida	191	18	45°51′41″N 89°35′24″W	
Black River Flowage 1610	Jackson	190	34	44°17′50″N 90°50′40″W	
Bony Lake	Bayfield	190	55	46°19′03″N 91°30′26″W	
Fish Lake	Burnett	190		45°43′55″N 92°46′34″W	
Mullet Lake	Fond du Lac	190	7	43°43′48″N 88°13′44″W	
North Bass Lake	Iron	190	11	46°11′41″N 89°57′43″W	
Wild Goose Lake	Polk	190	12	45°25′58″N 92°24′54″W	
Necedah Lake	Juneau	189	15	44°02′01″N 90°04′17″W	
Pike Lake	Chippewa	189	37	45°04′44″N 91°04′43″W	
Spencer Lake (Spence Lake)	Burnett	189	19	45°44′16″N 92°11′06″W	
Superior Falls Flowage	Iron	189	14	46°33′35″N 90°25′00″W	
Dates Millpond	Columbia, Marquette	188	6	43°38′16″N 89°21′58″W	
Deer Lake	Oneida	188	20	45°47′18″N 89°06′21″W	
Lake Creek	Oneida	188	12	45°40′12″N 89°24′19″W	
Lily Lake	Burnett	188	22	45°59′14″N 92°05′57″W	
Silver Lake	Washburn	188	28	45°59′24″N 91°49′18″W	
Bass Lake	Washburn	187	35	45°56′49″N 91°37′53″W	
Big Moon Lake	Barron	187	48	45°20′35″N 92°07′09″W	
Cedar Lake	Iron	187	21	46°12′29″N 89°57′13″W	
Lake Mary	Marinette	186	38	45°18′15″N 87°48′58″W	
Buffalo Lake	Bayfield	185	29	46°09′51″N 90°57′12″W	
Lake 5 7 58	Monroe	185	10	44°04′16″N 90°24′54″W	
Little Butternut Lake	Polk	185	23	45°34′05″N 92°30′08″W	
Moss Lake (Little Mud Lake)	Vilas	185	29	45°57′45″N 89°53′13″W	
Mud Lake	Dane	185	15	42°59′53″N 89°17′23″W	
Mud Lake	Jefferson	185	1	42°54′15″N 88°54′03″W	
Bass Lake	Oneida	184	20	45°39′38″N 89°25′43″W	
Bear Lake	Ashland	184	9	45°59′24″N 90°48′19″W	
Eau Claire Flowage (Schofield Lake)	Marathon	184	10	44°55′11″N 89°36′26″W	
Grandfather Flowage	Lincoln	184	32	45°19′07″N 89°47′01″W	
Little Bearskin Lake	Oneida	184	27	45°42′40″N 89°41′57″W	
Riley Lake	Price	184	5	45°51′26″N 90°09′50″W	
Ripley Lake	Washburn	184	27	45°42′39″N 91°51′10″W	
Sugar Bush Lake	Bayfield	184	10	46°15′20″N 91°12′23″W	
Emily Lake	Florence	183	43	45°52′28″N 88°17′00″W	
Lake Millicent	Bayfield	183	53	46°31′44″N 91°22′04″W	
Oak Lake	Burnett	183	19	45°55′53″N 92°07′43″W	
Collins Marsh 3 Reservoir	Manitowoc	182		44°05′23″N 87°57′52″W	
Hultman Lake	Price	182	14	45°24′11″N 90°10′32″W	
La Motte Lake	Menominee	182	71	44°53′06″N 88°36′06″W	
Pixley Flowage (Smith Lake)	Price	182	23	45°53′31″N 90°30′09″W	
Thunder Lake	Oneida	182	12	45°39′50″N 89°23′32″W	
Cincoe Lake	Waupaca	181	2	44°20′18″N 88°48′32″W	
Dunn Lake	Washburn	181	39	45°56′15″N 91°56′14″W	
Mercer Lake	Iron	181	24	46°09′42″N 90°04′03″W	
Upper Kaubashine Lake	Oneida	181	56	45°47′22″N 89°44′26″W	
Auroraville Millpond	Waushara	180	6	44°03′19″N 89°00′07″W	
Jungle Lake	Forest	180	14	45°27′18″N 88°50′00″W	
Lower Sugarbush Lake	Vilas	180	61	46°02′15″N 89°54′25″W	
Manawa Millpond	Waupaca	180	12	44°28′07″N 88°54′24″W	
Oconto Falls Pond	Oconto	180	28	44°52′51″N 88°10′06″W	
Pallette Lake (Clear Lake)	Vilas	180	60	46°03′59″N 89°36′14″W	
Wind Pudding Lake (Loew Lake)	Oneida	180	35	45°45′46″N 89°38′17″W	
Big Bear Lake	Burnett	179	17	46°01′01″N 92°09′11″W	
Cable Lake	Washburn	179	24	45°51′58″N 91°54′35″W	
Dueholm Flowage	Burnett	179		45°41′26″N 92°43′51″W	USGS considers this as two lakes, the other named Logging Creek Flowage
Little Round Lake	Sawyer	179	38	45°59′05″N 91°18′59″W	
Shepard Lake	Oneida	179	18	45°39′59″N 89°21′55″W	
Twin Lakes	Douglas	179	5	46°21′08″N 91°43′59″W	Two lakes collectively known as Twin Lakes (areas/max depths of 113/5, 66/5)
Black Brook Flowage	Burnett	178		45°50′23″N 92°26′06″W	
Boot Lake	Iron	178	16	46°02′21″N 90°08′27″W	
Gull Lake	Burnett	178	19	45°59′02″N 92°18′11″W	
Lake Placid	Sawyer	178	30	46°01′34″N 91°16′53″W	
Radisson Flowage	Sawyer	178	12	45°46′15″N 91°11′35″W	
Stone Lake	Oneida	178	16	45°48′57″N 89°24′07″W	
Anderson Lake	Oconto	177	40	45°06′50″N 88°25′17″W	
Big Bass Lake	Marathon	177	13	44°43′23″N 89°26′02″W	
Horseshoe Lake	Washburn	177	21	46°05′12″N 91°55′11″W	
Lake Seventeen	Oneida	176	37	45°46′44″N 89°46′10″W	
Neosho Millpond	Dodge	176	6	43°18′36″N 88°30′16″W	
Pickerel Lake	Oconto	176	10	45°21′10″N 88°35′06″W	
Tuscobia Lake	Barron	176	25	45°32′30″N 91°44′39″W	
Warner Lake	Burnett	176	75	45°47′54″N 92°13′19″W	
Crooked Lake	Oneida	175	13	45°44′39″N 89°05′22″W	
Hunter Lake	Vilas	175	40	46°00′13″N 89°19′20″W	
Meta Lake	Oneida, Vilas	175	25	45°53′21″N 89°10′57″W	
South Rice Lake	Marathon	175	5	44°42′22″N 89°55′57″W	
Otter Lake	Vilas	174	30	45°56′35″N 89°13′17″W	
Person Lake	Douglas	174	8	46°11′25″N 91°58′04″W	
Bad River Slough	Ashland	173	24	46°37′49″N 90°38′53″W	
Chain Lakes	Douglas	173	11	46°11′20″N 91°43′25″W	Two lakes collectively known as Chain Lakes (areas/max depths of 96/11, 77/4)
Pigeon Lake	Waupaca	173	10	44°37′43″N 88°46′55″W	
Round Lake	Vilas	173	25	46°10′19″N 89°42′37″W	
Dutch Hollow Lake	Sauk	172	38	43°36′07″N 90°11′20″W	
Echo Lake	Barron	172	41	45°26′45″N 92°07′47″W	
Harris Pond (Harrisville Lake)	Marquette	172	10	43°53′02″N 89°24′02″W	
Madeline Lake (Mud Lake)	Oneida, Vilas	172	17	45°53′41″N 89°38′35″W	
Tambling Lake	Vilas	172	11	45°55′50″N 89°09′50″W	
Augustine Lake	Ashland	171	10	46°10′46″N 90°27′39″W	
French Creek Wildlife Area Pool Number 2	Columbia	171	5	43°37′24″N 89°24′13″W	
Howell Lake (Silver Lake)	Forest	171	16	45°56′49″N 88°56′02″W	
Leader Lake	Douglas	171	56	46°11′39″N 91°51′45″W	
Lone Stone Lake	Oneida	171	30	45°51′55″N 89°04′57″W	
Town Corner Lake	Marinette	171	9	45°32′37″N 88°03′33″W	
Atkins Lake	Bayfield	170	80	46°16′41″N 91°02′11″W	
Bashaw Lake	Burnett	170	16	45°46′28″N 92°08′28″W	
Katinka Lake	Vilas	170	60	46°12′19″N 89°47′33″W	
Little Falls Lake	St. Croix	170	18	45°00′57″N 92°41′45″W	
Shoe Lake	Forest	170	15	45°25′39″N 88°45′04″W	
Tabor Lake (Loon Lake)	Burnett	170	28	46°01′42″N 92°16′55″W	
Cranberry Lake	Douglas	169	19	46°11′26″N 91°55′41″W	
Mud Lake	Door	169	5	45°07′01″N 87°05′35″W	
Murphy Flowage	Rusk	169	14	45°34′31″N 91°30′33″W	
Crooked Lake	Burnett	168	10	45°47′45″N 92°22′14″W	
Mildred Lake	Oneida	168	45	45°40′31″N 89°32′02″W	
Sailor Lake	Price	168	7	45°50′29″N 90°16′07″W	
Upper Clam Lake	Ashland	168	20	46°09′10″N 90°54′23″W	
Lake Delta	Bayfield	167	30	46°28′43″N 91°18′01″W	
Lake Denoon	Racine, Waukesha	167	55	42°50′48″N 88°10′08″W	
Mud Lake	Burnett	167	3	45°55′12″N 92°19′04″W	
Big Devil Lake (Audubon Lake)	Washburn	166	74	45°43′47″N 91°44′15″W	
Spectacle Lake	Vilas	166	35	46°00′02″N 89°01′15″W	
Tranus Lake	Washburn	166	12	46°00′50″N 91°39′53″W	
Morton Lake	Vilas	165	29	46°11′21″N 89°34′49″W	
Rocky Run Flowage	Oneida	165	11	45°42′40″N 89°44′21″W	
Arbutus Lake	Forest	163	28	45°24′05″N 88°51′41″W	
Eagle Lake (Murray Lake, Inch Lake)	Bayfield	163	52	46°29′56″N 91°21′26″W	
Little Tomahawk Lake	Oneida	163	48	45°47′49″N 89°38′15″W	
White Lake	Shawano	163	11	44°40′13″N 88°27′00″W	
Crooked Lake	Oconto	162	37	45°14′33″N 88°21′27″W	
Jag Lake	Vilas	162	27	46°05′04″N 89°43′20″W	
Trump Lake	Forest	162	20	45°28′34″N 88°39′23″W	
Wilson Flowage	Price	162	6	45°47′56″N 90°12′37″W	
Ellsworth Lake	Washburn	161	6	45°52′04″N 92°00′27″W	
Gaslyn Lake	Burnett	161	12	45°54′00″N 92°07′00″W	
Lazy Lake (Fall R Millpond)	Columbia	161	8	43°23′29″N 89°02′30″W	
Hoosier Lake	Grant	160	4	42°54′06″N 91°06′56″W	
Little Portage Lake	Vilas	160	11	46°07′57″N 89°15′30″W	
Lost Lake	Oneida	160	18	45°46′06″N 89°19′09″W	
Muskellunge Lake	Lincoln	160	26	45°31′29″N 89°41′17″W	
Cable Lake	Bayfield	159	43	46°13′29″N 91°18′24″W	
Franklin Lake	Oneida	159	25	45°52′13″N 89°51′50″W	
Turner Lake	Price, Vilas	159	12	45°54′31″N 90°02′53″W	
Twin Lakes	St. Croix	159		44°57′59″N 92°34′45″W	Two lakes collectively known as Twin Lakes (areas of 99, 60)
Oak Ridge Lake	St. Croix	158		45°11′04″N 92°28′48″W	
French Lake	La Crosse	157	9	43°51′13″N 91°16′20″W	
Price Lake	Florence	157	8	45°51′24″N 88°23′58″W	
Sparkling Lake (Silver Lake)	Vilas	157	60	46°00′31″N 89°41′59″W	
Twin Bear Lake (Crow Lake)	Bayfield	157	59	46°30′21″N 91°22′02″W	
20 Reservoir	Jackson	155	7	44°15′44″N 90°21′47″W	
Carlin Lake	Vilas	155	36	46°11′56″N 89°46′43″W	
Granite Lake	Barron	155	34	45°34′48″N 92°00′25″W	
Lake Lorraine	Walworth	155	8	42°44′05″N 88°44′02″W	
Potter Lake	Walworth	155	26	42°49′01″N 88°20′53″W	
Wilson Lake	Iron	155	21	46°07′02″N 90°06′55″W	
Little Crooked Lake	Vilas	154	30	46°09′03″N 89°41′42″W	
Mary Lake	Langlade, Oconto	154	20	45°17′31″N 88°41′03″W	
Poskin Lake	Barron	154	30	45°25′29″N 91°58′35″W	
Schnur Lake	Price	154	27	45°58′19″N 90°30′30″W	
Deer Lake	Burnett	153	23	46°02′34″N 92°10′35″W	
Fish Lake	Waushara	153	37	44°07′22″N 89°29′08″W	
Herde Lake	Chippewa	153	53	45°14′46″N 91°23′26″W	
Upper Twin Lake	Burnett	153	18	45°55′14″N 92°08′07″W	
White Lake	Langlade	153	42	45°09′52″N 88°46′06″W	
Pine Lake	Polk	152	53	45°35′11″N 92°17′36″W	
Steele Lake	Douglas	152	8	46°30′48″N 91°45′46″W	
Wausau Dam Lake	Marathon	152	28	44°57′26″N 89°38′16″W	
Bertom Lake	Grant	151	15	42°41′41″N 90°55′20″W	Not included in the WIDNR list of lakes.
Little John Lake	Vilas	151	19	46°00′52″N 89°38′43″W	
Mead Wildlife Area Pool Number 5	Marathon	151	8	44°41′39″N 89°47′19″W	
Pine Lake	Menominee	151	3	44°52′42″N 88°31′11″W	
Round Lake	Oneida	151	15	45°50′12″N 89°08′30″W	
Simms Lake	Douglas	151	41	46°15′50″N 91°40′29″W	
Tug Lake	Lincoln	151	21	45°18′11″N 89°42′02″W	
Tuttle Lake (Turtle Lake)	Marquette	151	33	43°55′45″N 89°17′29″W	
Atkins Lake (Mud Lake)	Forest, Oneida	150	3	45°39′20″N 89°02′44″W	
Bear Lake	Polk	150		45°22′07″N 92°30′48″W	
Deer Lake	Lincoln	150	62	45°32′48″N 89°41′42″W	
Long Trade Lake	Polk	150	13	45°37′25″N 92°36′01″W	
North Two Lakes	Oneida	150	47	45°47′08″N 89°36′24″W	
Pages Slough	Winnebago	150	6	44°11′17″N 88°48′51″W	
Vern Wolf Lake (East Lake)	Kenosha	150	12	42°37′34″N 88°07′13″W	
Burrows Lake	Oneida	149	28	45°38′04″N 89°51′29″W	
Jackson Lake	Bayfield	149	13	46°14′57″N 91°06′58″W	
Lower Gresham Lake	Vilas	149	12	46°02′34″N 89°45′01″W	
Ross Lake	Vilas	149	14	45°57′15″N 89°35′51″W	
Sawyer Lake (Edith Lake)	Langlade	149	31	45°14′51″N 88°45′33″W	
Brazee Lake	Dane	148	5	43°11′59″N 89°10′58″W	
Grand Portage Lake	Iron	148	33	46°10′23″N 90°02′58″W	
Lake Tahkodah (East Lake)	Bayfield	148	18	46°14′38″N 91°13′24″W	
Mud Lake	Ozaukee	148	4	43°22′28″N 88°01′14″W	
Pacwawong Lake	Sawyer	148	6	46°09′01″N 91°20′27″W	
Pike Lake	Polk	148	33	45°19′19″N 92°22′14″W	
Rainbow Lake	Vilas	148	36	46°14′35″N 89°50′49″W	
Frank Lake (Bear Lake)	Vilas	147	38	46°02′01″N 89°33′14″W	
Lake Pesobic	Lincoln	147	11	45°12′46″N 89°40′49″W	
Little Clam Lake	Ashland	147	11	46°09′15″N 90°53′15″W	
Peshtigo Lake	Forest	147	4	45°35′09″N 88°53′46″W	
White Ash Lake	Polk	147	9	45°26′53″N 92°18′40″W	
Martha Lake	Iron	146	55	46°10′21″N 90°01′56″W	
Wazee Lake	Jackson	146	350	44°17′24″N 90°43′23″W	
Bass Lake	Oconto	145	40	45°16′35″N 88°37′15″W	
Butternut Lake	Barron	145	15	45°37′50″N 91°54′16″W	
Eldorado Marsh	Fond du Lac	145		43°49′04″N 88°34′49″W	
Himley Lake (Leech Lake)	Forest	145	15	45°27′33″N 88°45′06″W	
Johnson Falls Flowage 647	Marinette	145	37	45°16′03″N 88°10′47″W	
Pleasant Lake	Walworth	145	29	42°47′16″N 88°33′07″W	
Silver Birch Lake	Pepin	145	8	44°35′52″N 92°01′36″W	
West Horsehead Lake	Oneida	145	23	45°41′51″N 89°37′24″W	
Duck Lake	Grant	144	6	42°52′27″N 91°05′28″W	Not included in the WIDNR list of lakes.
Leesome Lake (Bass Lake)	Washburn	144	53	45°46′25″N 91°44′03″W	
Little Presque Isle Lake	Vilas (Gogebic, Michigan)	144	18	46°14′06″N 89°36′23″W	
Rice Lake (Lower Whitewater Lake)	Walworth	144	10	42°46′20″N 88°41′48″W	
Savage Lake (Three Lake)	Florence	144	10	45°52′58″N 88°27′46″W	
Deer Lake	Price	143	18	45°43′20″N 90°24′38″W	
McLain Lake	Washburn	143	30	46°02′53″N 91°56′57″W	
Montana Lake	Marinette, Oconto	143	28	45°02′54″N 88°06′57″W	
Tippecanoe Lake (Island Lake)	Vilas	143	34	45°56′07″N 89°56′44″W	
Voyageur Lake (Smile-A-While Lake)	Vilas	143	14	45°55′28″N 89°11′03″W	
Aldridge Lake (Range Line Lake)	Oneida, Vilas	142	12	45°51′57″N 89°18′05″W	
Lake Six	Iron	142	15	46°13′56″N 90°17′33″W	
Townline Lake	Oneida	142	19	45°48′48″N 89°09′50″W	
Amik Lake (Rice Lake)	Vilas	141	8	45°55′56″N 90°02′00″W	
Dowling Lake	Douglas	141	13	46°28′27″N 92°02′42″W	
Sugar Maple Lake (Big Bass Lake)	Vilas	141	46	46°06′10″N 89°04′36″W	
Turtle Lake	Walworth	141	30	42°43′36″N 88°40′55″W	
Upper Sugarbush Lake	Vilas	141	29	46°02′01″N 89°52′35″W	
Big Dardis Lake	Price	140	23	45°44′11″N 90°20′03″W	
Bolton Lake	Vilas	140	36	45°57′31″N 89°48′08″W	
Dandy Creek Flowage	Monroe	140		44°05′15″N 90°21′26″W	
Impassable Lake	Oconto	140	5	45°03′25″N 88°16′51″W	
McGraw Lake	Burnett, Douglas	140	25	46°09′11″N 92°10′22″W	
Wazeecha Lake	Portage, Wood	140	20	44°21′55″N 89°44′25″W	
Chub Lake	Dodge	139	3	43°13′25″N 88°53′32″W	
Fortyacre Lake	Pepin	139	9	44°25′08″N 92°05′47″W	
Gilbert Lake	Waushara	139	65	44°12′46″N 89°10′09″W	
Goose Lake	Jefferson	139	4	43°02′59″N 88°34′57″W	
Mirror Lake	Sauk	139	19	43°33′50″N 89°49′59″W	
Scott Flowage	Marinette	139	20	45°06′24″N 87°38′52″W	
Towanda Lake (Bass Lake)	Vilas	139	27	45°56′19″N 89°42′28″W	
Waubeesee Lake (Minister Lake)	Racine	139	73	42°49′01″N 88°10′06″W	
Barber Lake	Sawyer	138	21	45°53′12″N 90°58′05″W	
Callahan Lake	Sawyer	138	18	45°59′21″N 91°14′24″W	
Ginty Lake	Oneida	138	12	45°40′08″N 89°10′27″W	
James Slough	Sawyer	138	14	45°53′37″N 91°13′38″W	
Stone Lake	Vilas	138	43	46°07′34″N 89°49′57″W	
Upper Steve Creek Flowage	Taylor	138	8	45°21′50″N 90°36′52″W	
Lone Pine Lake	Vilas	137	41	46°12′50″N 89°37′03″W	
Pine Lake	Waushara	137	48	44°13′58″N 89°09′45″W	
Spirit Lake	Price, Taylor	137	9	45°22′50″N 90°08′14″W	
Blue Spring Lake	Jefferson	136	27	42°51′34″N 88°36′01″W	
Catherine Lake	Iron	136	14	46°13′30″N 89°57′34″W	
Cedar Lake	Manitowoc	136	21	43°55′30″N 87°56′18″W	
East Ellerson Lake	Vilas	136	26	46°00′16″N 89°45′19″W	
Ghost Lake	Bayfield	136	30	46°11′06″N 91°00′58″W	
MacRae Lake	Washburn	136	45	45°44′43″N 91°36′28″W	
Point Lake	Burnett	136	7	45°55′17″N 92°14′30″W	
Spring Creek Flowage	Price	136	9	45°35′08″N 90°27′38″W	
Swamsauger Lake (Swampsauger Lake)	Oneida	136	15	45°47′07″N 89°57′28″W	
Twin Valley Lake	Iowa	136	32	43°01′24″N 90°05′33″W	
Bohner Lake	Racine	135	30	42°37′40″N 88°16′58″W	
Cemetery Slough	Marathon	135	8	44°48′08″N 89°42′30″W	
Gilas Lake	Marinette	135	88	45°09′43″N 88°10′23″W	
Halfmoon Lake	Eau Claire	135	9	44°48′51″N 91°31′04″W	
Lake George (Spring Valley Lake)	Pierce, St. Croix	135	29	44°51′38″N 92°14′31″W	
Largon Lake	Polk	135	10	45°36′51″N 92°11′51″W	
Meder Lake	Ashland	135	10	46°16′33″N 90°38′45″W	
Mitten Lake	Vilas	135	23	45°57′04″N 89°58′33″W	
Mud Lake	Douglas	135	29	46°39′44″N 92°12′30″W	
Nice Lake	Washburn	135	11	45°41′32″N 91°36′01″W	
Snowden Lake (Stone Lake)	Oneida	135	11	45°39′32″N 89°16′40″W	
Hunter Lake	Sawyer	134	17	45°55′23″N 90°59′50″W	
Loon Lake	Chippewa	134	9	45°14′51″N 91°28′01″W	
Phipps Flowage	Sawyer	134	13	46°04′09″N 91°25′18″W	
Black Lake (Birch Lake)	Ashland, Sawyer	133	17	45°59′19″N 90°55′58″W	
Broken Bow Lake	Vilas	133	23	45°55′13″N 89°57′20″W	
Cochran Lake	Vilas	133	12	46°11′16″N 89°30′58″W	
Soo Lake	Oneida	133	13	45°39′13″N 89°32′32″W	
Thunder Lake	Marinette	133	62	45°15′17″N 88°14′29″W	
Alabama Lake	Polk	132	28	45°36′48″N 92°37′28″W	
Bass Lake	Washburn	132	31	45°54′54″N 91°59′52″W	
Gordon Lake	Ashland	132	28	46°09′59″N 90°37′03″W	
Loveless Lake (Bass Lake)	Polk	132	20	45°26′22″N 92°29′50″W	
North Lake	Sawyer	132	30	46°07′15″N 91°12′54″W	
Pine Lake	Lincoln	132	17	45°30′02″N 89°26′17″W	
Seven Island Lake	Lincoln	132	31	45°25′29″N 89°28′02″W	
Spring Lake	Menominee	132	37	44°54′27″N 88°34′56″W	
Comus Lake	Walworth	131	6	42°38′31″N 88°38′31″W	
Cranberry Lake	Bayfield	131	12	46°15′47″N 91°32′41″W	
Horn Lake	Oconto	131	11	45°19′29″N 88°38′00″W	
Lower Devils Lake	Barron	131	26	45°37′35″N 91°45′40″W	
Maple Lake	Oneida	131	15	45°48′10″N 89°09′44″W	
Moon Lake	Vilas	131	38	45°55′04″N 89°26′04″W	
Port Edwards Flowage	Wood	131	16	44°20′58″N 89°51′07″W	
Tomahawk Lake	Bayfield	131	42	46°21′58″N 91°31′19″W	
Town Line Flowage (Schwartz Pool)	Jackson	131	7	44°20′00″N 90°37′26″W	
Upper Nashotah Lake	Waukesha	131	53	43°05′08″N 88°25′44″W	
Big Bay Lagoon	Ashland	130	10	46°48′33″N 90°40′50″W	
Ellwood Lake	Florence	130	25	45°51′30″N 88°08′33″W	
Lone Tree Lake	Vilas	130	16	46°02′50″N 89°30′13″W	
Birch Lake	Bayfield	129	8	46°19′09″N 91°29′28″W	
Crystal Lake	Sheboygan	129	61	43°48′21″N 88°01′04″W	
Marshall Millpond	Dane	129	5	43°10′29″N 89°04′17″W	
North Twin Lake	Polk	129	27	45°18′53″N 92°22′08″W	
Owl Lake	Iron	129	49	46°16′55″N 89°58′24″W	
Perch Lake	Sawyer	129	24	45°54′04″N 90°57′13″W	
Range Line Lake	Oneida	129	28	45°49′09″N 89°10′36″W	
Kekegama Lake	Washburn	128	24	45°39′18″N 91°49′10″W	
Myre Lake	Burnett	128	27	45°57′03″N 92°14′14″W	
Orienta Flowage	Bayfield	128	31	46°44′23″N 91°28′47″W	Not included in the WIDNR list of lakes.
Paddock Lake	Kenosha	128	32	42°34′23″N 88°06′04″W	
Rice Lake	Polk	128	10	45°30′06″N 92°29′26″W	
Skunk Lake	Oneida	128	7	45°44′42″N 89°50′38″W	
Horseshoe Lake	Polk	127	8	45°19′29″N 92°30′36″W	
Little Eau Pleine Flowage	Portage	127	8	44°40′30″N 89°43′57″W	
Neptune Lake (Ogemaga Lake, Bug Lake)	Oneida	127	7	45°35′23″N 89°10′25″W	
Owl Lake	Burnett	127	27	45°48′54″N 92°16′26″W	
Sand Bar Lake	Bayfield	127	49	46°22′07″N 91°31′44″W	
Sandstone Flowage	Marinette	127	39	45°13′40″N 88°05′00″W	
Center Lake	Kenosha	126	28	42°32′19″N 88°08′01″W	
Little Trade Lake	Burnett	126	19	45°40′49″N 92°36′04″W	
Loretta Lake (Brunet Flowage)	Sawyer	126	12	45°53′17″N 90°52′27″W	
McCann Lake	Rusk	126	38	45°18′17″N 91°24′34″W	
Mud Lake	Washburn	126	13	45°43′59″N 91°39′34″W	
Sherman Lake (Lost Lake)	Iron, Vilas	126	19	46°04′34″N 89°55′43″W	
Bass Lake	Douglas	125	26	46°12′57″N 91°51′15″W	
Chicog Lake	Washburn	125	25	46°03′25″N 91°55′22″W	
Friendship Lake (Millpond Lake)	Adams	125	15	43°58′55″N 89°47′57″W	
Hills Lake	Waushara	125	22	44°09′13″N 89°09′49″W	
Honey Island Flowage	Marathon	125	7	44°41′59″N 89°52′53″W	
Lower Kimball Lake	Washburn	125	6	46°07′15″N 91°56′59″W	
Lower White River Pond	Waushara	125	20	44°01′52″N 89°15′32″W	
Mill Lake	Vilas (Gogebic, Michigan)	125	8	46°09′47″N 89°15′04″W	
Pulaski Lake	Rusk	125	40	45°20′12″N 91°16′50″W	
Spider Lake	Bayfield	125	22	46°32′34″N 91°24′36″W	
Crooked Lake	Bayfield	124	34	46°31′12″N 91°19′30″W	
Goose Pool	Juneau	124		44°08′43″N 90°11′46″W	
Upper Scott Flowage 4060	Marinette	124	16	45°06′43″N 87°39′46″W	
White River Flowage (Lower Pond)	Waushara	124	19	44°01′37″N 89°15′13″W	Not included in the WIDNR list of lakes.
Gantenbein Lake	Pierce	123	5	44°36′48″N 92°35′42″W	USGS considers this as two lakes, the other named Marsh Lake
North Townline Flowage	Marathon	123	9	44°42′48″N 89°50′51″W	
Pine River Flowage	Florence	123	35	45°49′48″N 88°15′50″W	
Spider Lake	Oneida	123	29	45°45′39″N 89°26′33″W	
Caroline Lake	Ashland, Iron	122	8	46°16′20″N 90°33′17″W	
Christy Lake	Sawyer	122	10	46°07′40″N 90°58′47″W	
Druid Lake	Washington	122	53	43°16′41″N 88°24′27″W	
Pywaosit Lake	Menominee	122	59	44°53′44″N 88°31′21″W	
Rice Lake	Oneida	122	3	45°49′05″N 89°13′52″W	
School Section Lake	Waukesha	122	8	42°59′02″N 88°30′13″W	
Silver Lake (Paradise Valley Lake)	Washington	122	47	43°23′14″N 88°12′47″W	
Big Gibson Lake	Vilas	121	15	46°08′16″N 89°33′11″W	
Black Dan Lake (McDonald Lake)	Sawyer	121	37	45°53′52″N 90°55′57″W	
Cadotte Lake	Burnett	121	21	45°58′05″N 92°10′27″W	
Friess Lake	Washington	121	48	43°14′40″N 88°16′35″W	
Hunters Peak Reservoir	Jackson	121		44°14′06″N 90°21′56″W	
Lake Andrea	Kenosha	121	35	42°32′04″N 87°55′03″W	
McNaughton Lake	Oneida	121	9	45°44′49″N 89°35′09″W	
Tripp Lake (Trapp Lake)	Walworth	121	8	42°49′32″N 88°43′02″W	
Upper Springstead Lake	Iron	121	22	46°01′03″N 90°07′49″W	
Duck Lake	Langlade	120	19	45°22′51″N 89°14′51″W	
Le Tourneau Lake	Price	120	16	45°49′13″N 90°37′38″W	
Pleasant Lake	Marquette, Waushara	120	24	43°59′06″N 89°33′07″W	
Rock Lake	Vilas	120	18	46°15′33″N 89°52′18″W	
Starks Flowage	Oneida	120	9	45°40′30″N 89°15′48″W	
Straight Lake	Polk	120	12	45°36′17″N 92°24′48″W	
Wandawega Lake (Otter Lake)	Walworth	120	8	42°44′36″N 88°34′01″W	
Clam Falls Flowage	Polk	119	14	45°40′56″N 92°17′33″W	
Crystal Lake	Marquette	119	60	43°58′14″N 89°21′31″W	
Hodstradt Lake	Oneida	119	36	45°48′26″N 89°33′49″W	
Long Lake	Lincoln	119	64	45°25′47″N 89°28′38″W	
Long Lake (Big Long Lake)	Manitowoc	119	38	44°08′18″N 88°02′16″W	
Monson Lake	Burnett	119		45°53′44″N 92°36′02″W	
Bass Lake	Barron	118	14	45°17′46″N 91°35′58″W	
Booth Lake	Walworth	118	24	42°48′03″N 88°25′47″W	
Ellison Lake	Bayfield, Douglas	118	18	46°21′30″N 91°32′56″W	
Hanscom Lake	Burnett	118	7	45°58′33″N 92°08′37″W	
Little Bear Lake	Burnett	118	55	45°59′22″N 92°09′38″W	
Pine Lake	St. Croix	118	21	45°02′00″N 92°22′39″W	
Crystal Lake	Bayfield	117	29	46°14′47″N 91°08′43″W	
Diamond Lake	Oneida	117	17	45°52′29″N 89°54′27″W	
Goose Lake	Pierce	117	35	44°34′59″N 92°29′38″W	
Lake Morris	Waushara	117	40	44°07′07″N 89°12′22″W	
Marinuka Lake	Trempealeau	117	9	44°05′18″N 91°21′05″W	
Mud Lake	Dodge	117	3	43°13′59″N 88°52′43″W	
Nugget Lake	Pierce	117	50	44°40′08″N 92°12′52″W	
Pat Shay Lake (Shay Lake)	Forest	117	5	45°53′29″N 89°01′58″W	
Poplar Lake	Polk	117	34	45°22′47″N 92°35′41″W	
Rice Lake	Dane	117	8	42°53′54″N 89°01′59″W	
Garth Lake	Oneida	116	22	45°45′40″N 89°45′05″W	
Great Bass Lake	Oneida	116	15	45°52′15″N 89°56′11″W	
Lake 30-7	Jackson	116	7	44°16′36″N 90°19′11″W	
Marion Millpond	Waupaca	116	12	44°40′26″N 88°54′10″W	
Mud Lake	Oneida	116	9	45°46′25″N 89°08′02″W	
Nixon Lake	Vilas	116	5	46°05′54″N 89°33′07″W	
Norwood Lake	Vilas (Gogebic, Michigan)	116	50	46°06′39″N 89°01′03″W	
Waubee Lake	Oconto	116	23	45°20′43″N 88°26′32″W	
White Ash Lake	Polk	116	9	45°27′46″N 92°18′41″W	
Bolger Lake	Oneida	115	45	45°50′31″N 89°43′10″W	
Conners Lake	Burnett	115	16	45°54′41″N 92°18′11″W	
Diamond Lake	Vilas	115	40	46°02′38″N 89°42′57″W	
Randall Lake	Iron	115	12	46°01′41″N 90°01′26″W	
Rose Lake (Bear Lake)	Langlade	115	24	45°13′56″N 88°43′10″W	
Bass Lakes	Menominee	114	51	45°06′36″N 88°52′43″W	
Big Dummy Lake	Barron	114	54	45°34′20″N 91°59′01″W	
Clear Lake	Burnett	114	55	45°46′01″N 92°23′05″W	
Diamond Lake	Polk	114	15	45°43′25″N 92°27′51″W	
Long Lake	Columbia	114	20	43°30′47″N 89°26′49″W	
Rice Lake	Iron	114	21	46°11′00″N 90°04′26″W	
Sea Lion Lake	Florence	114	82	45°52′39″N 88°19′22″W	
Sherwood Lake	Clark	114	9	44°25′41″N 90°22′35″W	
Thompson Lake	Price	114	25	45°58′43″N 90°07′55″W	
Brandy Lake (Cecilia Lake)	Vilas	113	44	45°54′25″N 89°42′03″W	
Dike 4 Flowage	Burnett	113		45°50′37″N 92°39′25″W	
Hatch Lake	Waupaca	113	12	44°31′52″N 89°06′53″W	
Horseshoe Lake	Barron	113	19	45°37′34″N 92°05′14″W	
Little Crawling Stone Lake	Vilas	113	44	45°55′42″N 89°53′53″W	
Long Lake	Oneida	113	58	45°43′03″N 89°36′17″W	
McCormick Lake	Oneida	113	8	45°44′05″N 89°46′21″W	
Moccasin Lake	Langlade	113	38	45°26′45″N 89°16′12″W	
Moose Lake	Langlade	113	20	45°04′31″N 89°02′57″W	
Spur Lake	Oneida	113	3	45°43′13″N 89°09′26″W	
White Bass Lake	Bayfield	113	30	46°10′26″N 90°56′15″W	
White Birch Lake	Vilas	113	27	46°03′48″N 89°31′22″W	
East Twin Lake	Ashland	112	15	46°11′23″N 90°51′25″W	
Lake Ellen	Sheboygan	112	42	43°38′47″N 88°00′54″W	
Long Lake	Waupaca	112	76	44°19′21″N 89°10′53″W	Part of the Chain O' Lakes
Bass Lake	Polk	111	19	45°33′55″N 92°16′50″W	
Cochran Lake	Price	111	20	45°57′53″N 90°06′31″W	
Long Lake	Ashland	111	13	46°15′34″N 90°38′45″W	
Lower Twin Lake	Burnett	111	9	45°54′31″N 92°08′41″W	
Van Loon Lake	La Crosse	111	3	44°02′16″N 91°18′49″W	
3 Reservoir	Adams	110		43°52′44″N 89°51′08″W	
Apple Lake	St. Croix	110	32	45°10′51″N 92°36′56″W	
Audie Lake	Rusk	110	32	45°32′49″N 91°26′05″W	
Benet Lake	Kenosha (Lake, Illinois)	110	24	42°29′53″N 88°04′09″W	
Crystal Lake	Barron	110	22	45°28′59″N 92°06′05″W	
Day Lake	Vilas	110	57	46°03′43″N 89°42′16″W	
Erickson Lake	Vilas	110	18	45°56′51″N 89°37′21″W	
Little Sand Lake	Vilas	110	32	46°01′29″N 89°49′46″W	
Phantom Lake	Waukesha	110	29	42°50′56″N 88°21′02″W	
Sandy Beach Lake	Iron	110	13	46°06′22″N 89°58′17″W	
Basswood Lake	Bayfield	109	15	46°27′59″N 91°19′08″W	
Decatur Lake	Green	109	10	42°39′06″N 89°25′01″W	
Dells Lake	Bayfield	109	42	46°10′47″N 90°59′10″W	
Duck Lake	Barron	109	26	45°33′31″N 91°59′33″W	
Nelson Lake	Vilas	109	50	45°55′49″N 89°21′26″W	
Pensaukee Lakes	Shawano	109	49	44°48′58″N 88°23′24″W	
Big Lake	Jackson, Juneau	108	8	44°11′20″N 90°18′16″W	
Finley Lake	Vilas	108	26	45°54′38″N 89°25′06″W	
Hope Lake	Jefferson	108	24	43°01′29″N 88°59′03″W	
Lake Emily	Portage	108	35	44°28′13″N 89°20′16″W	
Long Lake	Oneida	108	31	45°47′11″N 89°29′29″W	
Main Flowage	Marathon	108	8	44°43′40″N 90°11′25″W	
Round Lake	Rusk	108	5	45°21′06″N 91°16′28″W	
Stump Lake	Barron	108	7	45°32′18″N 91°44′13″W	
Tom Doyle Lake	Oneida	108	30	45°45′51″N 89°29′36″W	
Two Boys Lake	Sawyer	108	37	45°53′58″N 91°12′31″W	
Upper Ninemile Lake	Forest, Vilas	108	5	45°54′40″N 89°03′11″W	
Wilkerson Lake	Washburn	108	8	45°52′36″N 92°01′25″W	
Dollar Lake	Vilas	107	15	45°55′05″N 89°12′18″W	
Fish Lake	Rusk	107	40	45°18′21″N 91°30′03″W	
Flannery Lake	Oneida	107	35	45°39′39″N 89°29′54″W	
Grassy Lake	Vilas	107	4	46°08′50″N 89°36′49″W	
Muskesin Lake (Big Bass Lake)	Vilas	107	22	46°01′05″N 89°54′47″W	
Saint Johns Lake	Forest	107	21	45°26′23″N 88°52′39″W	
Supple Marsh	Fond du Lac	107	4	43°48′00″N 88°27′44″W	
Tucker Lake	Price	107	32	45°56′40″N 90°03′09″W	
Watersmeet Lake	Vilas	107	12	45°54′36″N 89°17′33″W	
Bass Lake	Lincoln	106	40	45°25′43″N 89°29′23″W	
Derosier Lake	Washburn	106	11	46°08′46″N 91°42′10″W	
Duck Lake	Vilas	106	20	45°56′44″N 89°14′12″W	
Grant Lake (Riley Lake)	Iron	106	10	46°06′42″N 90°04′33″W	
Half Moon Lake (Millpond Lake)	Bayfield	106	10	46°33′41″N 91°23′52″W	
Lake 18 13 22	Monroe	106	7	44°07′31″N 90°24′33″W	
Lake Laura	Forest	106	22	45°42′20″N 88°30′04″W	
Sand Lake	Menominee	106	28	44°53′20″N 88°32′33″W	
Slim Creek Flowage	Washburn	106	27	45°47′28″N 91°35′26″W	
South Twin Lake	Washburn	106	29	46°03′44″N 91°57′42″W	
Star Lake	Sawyer	106	15	46°09′03″N 91°07′48″W	
Buffalo Lake	Oneida	105	27	45°52′44″N 89°34′10″W	
Crystal Lake	Lincoln	105	22	45°32′31″N 89°42′24″W	
Deer Lake	Washburn	105	19	45°57′04″N 92°00′03″W	
Frederick Flowage	Oneida	105	16	45°44′17″N 89°29′04″W	
Long Lake	Racine	105	25	42°49′49″N 88°10′23″W	
McMillan Reservoir (Reservoir Lake)	Marathon	105	12	44°44′04″N 90°12′31″W	
Paya Lake	Oconto	105	40	45°16′34″N 88°29′05″W	
Spring Lake	Jefferson	105	11	42°52′49″N 88°34′23″W	
Spring Lake	Waukesha	105	22	42°54′53″N 88°22′20″W	
Bass Bay Lake	Waukesha	104	23	42°53′47″N 88°07′01″W	
Bass Lake	Florence	104	68	45°53′24″N 88°08′18″W	Part of the Spread Eagle Chain of Lakes
Bittersweet Lake (Crooked Lake)	Vilas	104	31	45°55′44″N 89°36′05″W	
Lake Five	Washington, Waukesha	104	23	43°11′43″N 88°16′26″W	
Lake John	Oconto	104	23	45°20′13″N 88°29′33″W	
Lake Sixteen	Price	104	5	45°36′12″N 90°29′59″W	
Little Birch Lake (Riley Lake, Mud Lake)	Forest	104	15	45°34′16″N 88°39′35″W	
Mission Lake (Crooked Lake)	Marathon	104	26	44°46′40″N 89°21′09″W	
Pine Lake	Waushara	104	21	44°07′48″N 89°30′36″W	
Townline Lake	Polk	104		45°24′48″N 92°17′21″W	
Waupee Flowage	Oconto	104	9	45°13′59″N 88°22′54″W	
Windfall Lake	Sawyer	104	16	45°39′51″N 91°12′40″W	
Hooker Lake	Kenosha	103	24	42°33′33″N 88°06′04″W	
Mallard Lake	Burnett	103	35	45°53′58″N 92°10′40″W	
McKinley Lake	Washburn	103	23	45°54′44″N 91°55′26″W	
Sauntrys Pocket Lake	Douglas	103	9	46°13′55″N 91°41′20″W	
Second Lake	Oneida	103	11	45°39′50″N 89°17′58″W	
Somers Lake	Polk	103	12	45°39′35″N 92°20′36″W	
Wilson Lake	Sawyer	103	25	46°07′50″N 91°08′03″W	
Albany Lake (Millpond Lake)	Green	102	8	42°42′24″N 89°26′22″W	
Burkhardt Mill Pond	St. Croix	102	38	45°01′34″N 92°40′02″W	
Columbus Lake	Crawford	102	14	43°21′00″N 91°10′41″W	Not included in the WIDNR list of lakes.
Flora Lake	Vilas	102	40	46°10′51″N 89°39′26″W	
Freedom Lakes	Polk	102	4	45°38′09″N 92°34′00″W	
Halfmoon Lake	Lincoln	102	14	45°31′28″N 89°43′52″W	
Hay Lake	Ashland, Iron, Price	102	5	45°58′54″N 90°17′53″W	
Helen Lake	Vilas	102	19	46°10′48″N 89°25′28″W	
The Bay	Pepin	102	9	44°24′54″N 92°05′50″W	
Virgin Lake	Iron	102	45	46°16′49″N 89°59′23″W	
Bass Lake	Washburn	101	66	45°42′25″N 91°38′52″W	
Big Quinnesec Falls Flowage	Marinette	101	73	45°46′59″N 88°02′42″W	
Boot Lake (Shadow Lake)	Florence	101	30	45°57′20″N 88°25′04″W	
Little Long Lake	Forest	101	30	45°25′30″N 88°46′16″W	
Loon Lake	Douglas	101	20	46°22′42″N 91°33′40″W	
Mink River Lake	Door	101	13	45°13′47″N 87°02′19″W	
Oscar-Jenny Lake	Oneida	101	24	45°37′16″N 89°40′07″W	
Pearl Lake	Waushara	101	45	44°05′19″N 89°07′05″W	
Shallow Lake	Barron, Burnett, Washburn	101	30	45°38′26″N 92°01′45″W	
Tamarack Lake	Oneida	101	22	45°45′14″N 89°20′29″W	
Worcester Lake	Price	101	37	45°35′16″N 90°18′40″W	
Baker Lake	Washburn	100	21	45°47′30″N 91°42′18″W	
Bean Lake	Washburn	100	35	45°56′49″N 91°35′02″W	
Deep Lake	Bayfield	100	28	46°33′19″N 91°27′35″W	
Dynamite Lake	Langlade	100	28	45°22′20″N 89°16′14″W	
Fuller Lake	Oneida	100	15	45°53′17″N 89°58′43″W	
Harmon Lake	Washburn	100	33	45°46′28″N 91°40′03″W	
Minonk Lake (Deer Lake)	Vilas	100	27	46°14′53″N 89°46′17″W	
Schoeneberg Marsh	Columbia	100		43°20′52″N 89°18′23″W	

== Unnamed lakes ==
The WIDNR identifies over 8,000 unnamed lakes/reservoirs in Wisconsin, although this is not an exhaustive list. Below is the list of those greater than 100 acres identified by the WIDNR. Areas and max depths are provided by WIDNR unless otherwise noted.

Waterbody ID Code	County	Area (acres)	Max depth (feet)	Coordinates	Notes
5558706	Buffalo, Trempealeau	4,773		44°01′55″N 91°33′15″W	
1313900	Juneau	541	4	44°02′55″N 90°17′02″W	
1735000	Jackson	398	12	44°19′18″N 90°21′12″W	
1356600	Wood	389	3	44°20′54″N 90°02′45″W	
1318700	Jackson	334		44°10′56″N 90°21′33″W	
1330200	Monroe	315	9	44°05′04″N 90°25′12″W	
733100	Pierce	300	57	44°36′50″N 92°36′24″W	
2341000	Vilas	269		46°07′06″N 89°36′15″W	
5566521	Dodge	253		43°33′52″N 88°38′11″W	
1356400	Wood	244	5	44°21′24″N 90°02′42″W	
1554900	Lincoln	238	16	45°29′01″N 89°42′58″W	
1336200	Jackson	236	7	44°10′06″N 90°26′48″W	
1322100	Jackson	230	4	44°12′43″N 90°19′38″W	
1340800	Monroe	228		44°01′56″N 90°27′54″W	
2727600	Sawyer	217	7	46°02′48″N 91°21′28″W	
1737600	Wood	208	2	44°19′42″N 90°18′21″W	
5566074	Dodge	196		43°35′26″N 88°38′54″W	
5567346	Dodge	187		43°32′10″N 88°37′46″W	
1676800	La Crosse	184	1	43°57′30″N 91°19′21″W	
5580092	Grant	182	12	42°37′10″N 90°39′34″W	
729400	Buffalo	158	5	44°06′00″N 91°41′06″W	
1809200	Buffalo	157		44°10′40″N 91°45′05″W	
5583266	Oneida	154	4	45°49′30″N 89°29′08″W	
1376400	Adams	153	8	44°03′14″N 90°00′24″W	
1340200	Monroe	152		44°01′33″N 90°27′26″W	
1336900	Jackson	149	5	44°10′28″N 90°25′14″W	
5565808	Dodge	140		43°35′56″N 88°39′56″W	
1317100	Juneau	139	5	44°10′02″N 90°17′39″W	
5540624	Marathon	138	7	44°42′58″N 89°40′16″W	
5511301	Oneida	136	1	45°52′40″N 89°23′34″W	
723700	Crawford	134	45	43°04′11″N 91°09′12″W	
1360200	Wood	134	4	44°18′35″N 90°01′42″W	
1314700	Juneau	131	3	44°03′27″N 90°16′58″W	
5590225	Dodge	123		43°35′15″N 88°40′56″W	
4000010	Chippewa, Rusk	119	15	NA	Although identified by the WIDNR as a lake/reservoir, there were no given coordinates
1333900	Monroe	118	13	44°08′18″N 90°26′33″W	
1327700	Monroe	116	9	44°04′12″N 90°27′47″W	
2256300	Price	115	6	45°52′00″N 90°21′38″W	
1339500	Monroe	109		44°01′14″N 90°28′44″W	
1737900	Wood	109		44°18′49″N 90°16′45″W	
1317800	Juneau	103	2	44°10′31″N 90°18′03″W	
1707400	Jackson	101	7	44°15′50″N 90°47′40″W	
724750	Crawford	100		43°21′31″N 91°09′45″W	

== County list ==
Here is the breakdown of the lakes by county. The northern counties have a higher density of lakes as a result, in part, from the Laurentide ice sheet during the Wisconsin glaciation. As counties in the Driftless Area of southwestern Wisconsin were not covered by ice at that time, there are significantly fewer lakes. The unnamed lakes column only includes those identified by the WIDNR, which is not exhaustive. The sum of the columns do not equal the Wisconsin total as lakes shared by multiple counties are listed under each county.

County	Named lakes	Unnamed lakes	Total lakes	Number of lakes per 100 sq mi	Largest lake entirely within county		
County	Named lakes	Unnamed lakes	Total lakes	Number of lakes per 100 sq mi	Lake	Area (acres)	Coordinates
Adams	40	27	67	10.4	Camelot Lake	393	44°13’37”N 89°45’53”W
Ashland	95	90	185	17.7	Day Lake	578	46°11’15”N 90°54’23”W
Barron	131	230	361	41.8	Prairie Lake	1,408	45°21’31”N 91°40’58”W
Bayfield	353	544	897	60.7	Namekagon Lake	2,897	46°13’18”N 91°06’07”W
Brown	9	24	33	6.2	Bay Beach Lagoons	50	44°31’35”N 87°58’33”W
Buffalo	27	24	51	7.6	Big Lake	2,400	44°22’49”N 91°57’57”W
Burnett	284	193	477	58.0	Yellow Lake	2,283	45°55’09”N 92°23’55”W
Calumet	8	4	12	3.8	Becker Lake	35	44°07’51”N 88°02’52”W
Chippewa	196	288	484	48.0	Lake Wissota	6,148	44°57’40”N 91°19’13”W
Clark	28	51	79	6.5	Mead Lake	310	44°47’24”N 90°45’26”W
Columbia	46	43	89	11.6	Mud Lake	817	43°24’42”N 89°17’26”W
Crawford	20	72	92	16.1	Lake Winneshiek	4,635	43°15’39”N 91°03’15”W
Dane	59	25	84	7.0	Lake Mendota	9,781	43°06’18”N 89°25’12”W
Dodge	30	26	56	6.4	Beaver Dam Lake	6,718	43°29’10”N 88°51’47”W
Door	28	3	31	6.4	Kangaroo Lake (excluding Sturgeon Bay)	1,156	45°02’06”N 87°09’31”W
Douglas	164	262	426	32.7	Saint Croix Flowage	2,247	46°15’22”N 91°52’17”W
Dunn	18	21	39	4.6	Tainter Lake	1,605	44°58’39”N 91°51’22”W
Eau Claire	16	18	34	5.3	Eau Claire Lake	870	44°45’41”N 91°06’19”W
Florence	110	143	253	51.8	Twin Falls Flowage	570	45°52’25”N 88°04’16”W
Fond du Lac	39	18	57	7.9	Mullet Marsh 15 Reservoir	344	43°44’39”N 88°12’08”W
Forest	206	519	725	71.5	Metonga Lake	2,038	45°32’27”N 88°54’15”W
Grant	36	21	57	5.0	McCartney Lake	952	42°40’57”N 90°52’42”W
Green	6	0	6	1.0	Decatur Lake	109	42°39’06”N 89°25’01”W
Green Lake	15	28	43	12.3	Green Lake	7,920	43°48’37”N 89°00’07”W
Iowa	25	11	36	4.7	Blackhawk Lake	212	43°01’16”N 90°17’06”W
Iron	227	266	493	65.0	Turtle-Flambeau Flowage	12,942	46°04’30”N 90°10’48”W
Jackson	71	130	201	20.3	Unnamed lake (Waterbody ID Code 1735000)	398	44°19’18”N 90°21’12”W
Jefferson	33	8	41	7.4	Rock Lake	1,365	43°04’42”N 88°55’50”W
Juneau	44	53	97	12.6	Sprague-Mather Flowage	810	44°08’32”N 90°10’53”W
Kenosha	41	8	49	18.0	Silver Lake	516	42°33’03”N 88°09’14”W
Kewaunee	17	2	19	5.5	Engledinger Lake	52	44°21’06”N 87°42’53”W
La Crosse	18	23	41	9.1	Lake Onalaska	8,391	43°54’18”N 91°17’57”W
Lafayette	10	10	20	3.2	Yellowstone Lake	453	42°45’51”N 89°58’26”W
Langlade	247	517	764	87.8	Rolling Stone Lake	682	45°26’06”N 88°56’48”W
Lincoln	158	415	573	65.2	Lake Mohawksin	1,515	45°28’06”N 89°45’03”W
Manitowoc	61	52	113	19.2	Collins Marsh 3 Reservoir	182	44°05’23”N 87°57’52”W
Marathon	73	154	227	14.7	Big Eau Pleine Reservoir	6,348	44°44’27”N 89°49’17”W
Marinette	258	188	446	31.9	Lake Noquebay	2,398	45°15’24”N 87°54’30”W
Marquette	65	40	105	23.0	Buffalo Lake	2,179	43°46’28”N 89°24’15”W
Menominee	57	71	128	35.8	Legend Lake	1,304	44°53’14”N 88°37’46”W
Milwaukee	44	9	53	22.0	Northridge Lake	42	43°10’47”N 88°00’01”W
Monroe	49	99	148	16.4	Unnamed lake (Waterbody ID Code 1330200)	315	44°05’04”N 90°25’12”W
Oconto	209	164	373	37.4	White Potato Lake	1,023	45°08’39”N 88°12’38”W
Oneida	452	642	1,094	98.3	Willow Flowage	4,217	45°43’10”N 89°52’53”W
Outagamie	17	29	46	7.2	Black Otter Lake	78	44°19’49”N 88°37’56”W
Ozaukee	27	26	53	22.7	Mud Lake	148	43°22’28”N 88°01’14”W
Pepin	12	26	38	16.4	Silver Birch Lake	145	44°35’52”N 92°01’36”W
Pierce	29	42	71	12.4	Dead Slough Lake	458	44°34’27”N 92°29’43”W
Polk	266	205	471	51.5	Balsam Lake	1,901	45°27’55”N 92°25’38”W
Portage	92	55	147	18.4	Wisconsin River Flowage	2,489	44°33’02”N 89°37’27”W
Price	172	248	420	33.5	Solberg Lake	844	45°45’14”N 90°22’19”W
Racine	30	2	32	9.6	Wind Lake	919	42°49’26”N 88°08’28”W
Richland	28	2	30	5.1	Balmoral Pond	59	43°13’35”N 90°28’14”W
Rock	25	58	83	11.6	Clear Lake	77	42°47’58”N 88°58’46”W
Rusk	96	194	290	31.7	Dairyland Reservoir	1,870	45°31’45”N 91°00’09”W
Sauk	44	29	73	8.8	Lake Redstone	635	43°36’24”N 90°05’33”W
Sawyer	268	289	557	44.3	Lake Chippewa	14,593	45°56’01”N 91°11’00”W
Shawano	60	80	140	15.7	Shawano Lake	6,215	44°48’27”N 88°31’07”W
Sheboygan	42	44	86	16.8	Sheboygan Lake	646	43°50’19”N 88°04’16”W
St. Croix	50	49	99	13.7	Bass Lake	370	45°04’02”N 92°38’56”W
Taylor	122	208	330	33.9	Chequamegon Waters Flowage	2,366	45°12’42”N 90°42’08”W
Trempealeau	25	25	50	6.8	Marinuka Lake	117	44°05’18”N 91°21’05”W
Vernon	35	50	85	10.7	Jersey Valley Lake	52	43°41’30”N 90°47’46”W
Vilas	603	544	1,147	133.9	Trout Lake	3,864	46°02’29”N 89°40’17”W
Walworth	51	11	62	11.2	Geneva Lake	5,401	42°33’54”N 88°30’13”W
Washburn	271	683	954	119.7	Long Lake	3,478	45°42’26”N 91°40’14”W
Washington	56	11	67	15.6	Cedar Lake	937	43°23’03”N 88°15’45”W
Waukesha	89	57	146	26.6	Pewaukee Lake	2,437	43°04’23”N 88°18’24”W
Waupaca	145	95	240	32.1	Partridge Lake	1,185	44°16’34”N 88°53’25”W
Waushara	118	51	169	27.0	Silver Lake	328	44°03’17”N 89°14’02”W
Winnebago	9	22	31	7.1	Lake Butte des Morts	8,581	44’04’13”N 88’38’19”W
Wood	36	101	137	17.3	Wisconsin Rapids Flowage	504	44°24’29”N 89°48’42”W
WISCONSIN	6,749	8,732	15,481	23.6	Lake Winnebago	131,969	44°01’01”N 88°24’34”W
