= Europe Lake =

Lake in Door County, Wisconsin, United States

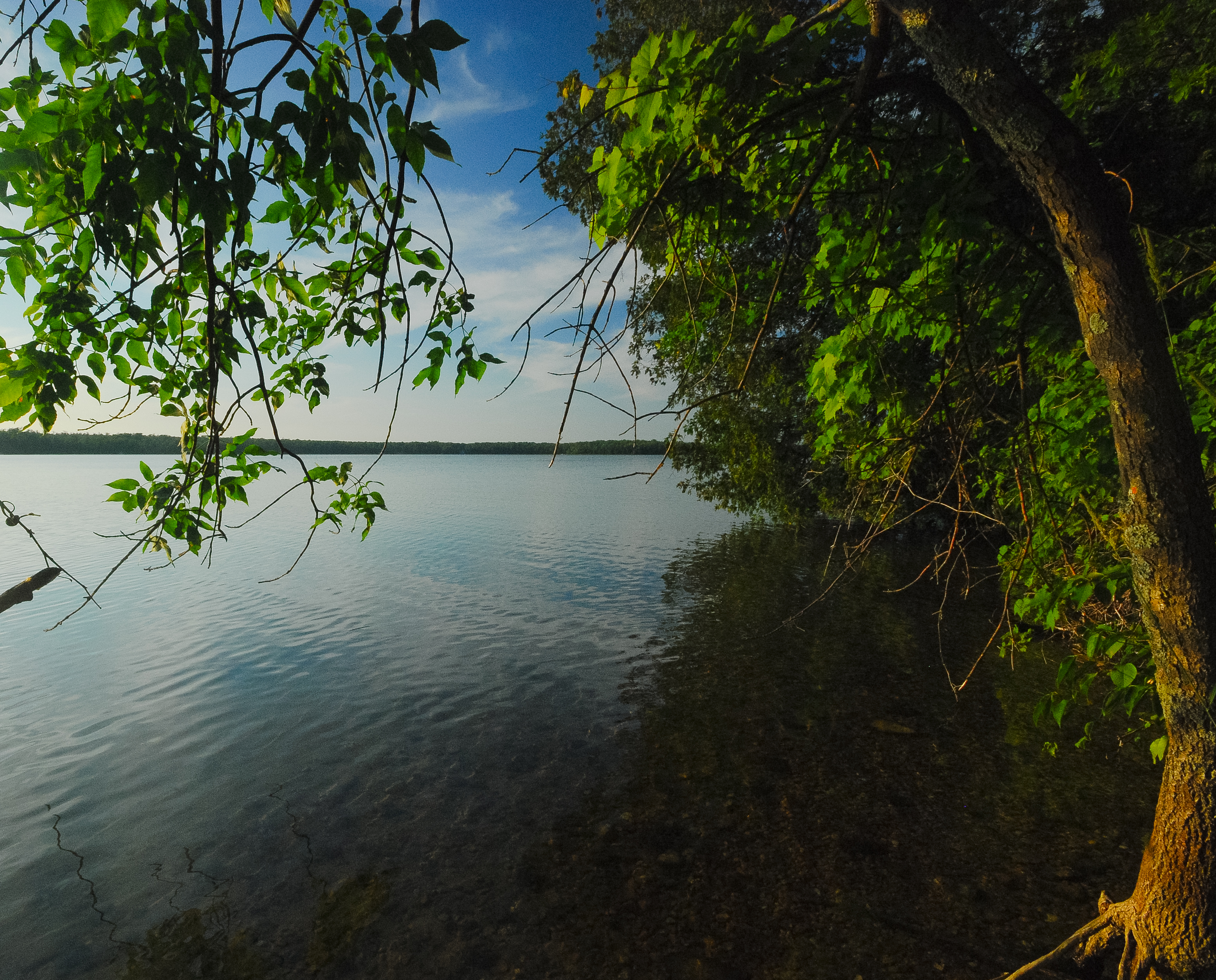
- Interactive map of Europe Lake
- Location: Door County, Wisconsin
- Coordinates: 45.27221°N 86.98706°W
- Basin countries: United States
- Surface area: 297 acres (120 ha)
- Average depth: 6 ft (1.8 m)
- Max. depth: 10 ft (3.0 m)
- Surface elevation: 600 ft (180 m)
- Settlements: Liberty Grove

Europe Lake is a lake near Gills Rock in Door County, Wisconsin. It is the northeasternmost lake in Wisconsin. The lake is mainly a shallow lowland marsh, similar to nearby Kangaroo Lake. It has a maximum depth of 10 feet. Fish include Panfish, Smallmouth bass, Northern pike, Walleye and Perch.

The lake was once part of Lake Michigan until a drop in Lake Michigan's water levels closed off the bay and made it a lake.

== Location and climate ==
Europe Lake (Wisconsin)

Europe Lake is the large lake to the left

Europe Bay (near Europe Lake)

Climate chart (precipitation, max. and min. temperature)
J	F	M	A	M	J	J	A	S	O	N	D
66 −4 −9	60 −8 −10	62 0 −4	112 3 0	86 9 3	77 13 10	96 18 16	73 19 16	109 17 14	119 10 7	110 6 5	66 4 1
- █ Average max. and min. temperatures in °C
- █ Precipitation totals in mm
Imperial conversion
J	F	M	A	M	J	J	A	S	O	N	D
2.6 25 16	2.4 18 14	2.4 32 25	4.4 37 32	3.4 48 37	3 55 50	3.8 64 61	2.9 66 61	4.3 63 57	4.7 50 45	4.3 43 41	2.6 39 34
- █ Average max. and min. temperatures in °F
- █ Precipitation totals in inches

== See also ==
- List of lakes of Wisconsin § Door County
