= Big Dummy Lake =

Lake in the United States of America

- Location within Wisconsin
- Location: Barron County, Wisconsin
- Coordinates: 45°34′24″N 91°59′2″W
- Type: lake
- Surface area: 114-acre (46 ha)

Big Dummy Lake is a lake in Barron County, Wisconsin, in the United States. It has a maximum depth of 54 feet.

The 114-acre (46 ha) lake may be used for recreational boating and fishing.

== See also ==
- List of lakes in Wisconsin
