= Big Muskellunge Lake =

Lake in the state of Wisconsin, United States

- Location within Wisconsin Location within the United States
- Location: Vilas County, Wisconsin
- Coordinates: 46.0173745°N 89.6148908°W
- Type: Seepage Lake
- Surface area: 897 acres (363 ha)
- Average depth: 26 feet (7.9 m)
- Max. depth: 70 feet (21 m)
- Surface elevation: 1,641 feet (500 m)

Big Muskellunge Lake is a 897 acre lake in Vilas County, Wisconsin. The maximum depth is 70 feet and the average depth is 26 feet. Fish present in the lake are muskellunge, largemouth bass, smallmouth bass, northern pike and walleye. There is three public boat ramps on the lake.

The lake is largely surrounded by the Northern Highland–American Legion State Forest.

== See also ==
- List of lakes in Wisconsin
