= Lost Land Lake =

Lake in the state of Wisconsin, United States

- Location within Wisconsin Location within the United States
- Location: Sawyer County, Wisconsin
- Coordinates: 46.0985600°N 91.1453067°W
- Type: Drainage Lake
- Surface area: 1,264 acres (512 ha)
- Average depth: 12 feet (3.7 m)
- Max. depth: 21 feet (6.4 m)
- Surface elevation: 1,381 feet (421 m)

Lost Land Lake is a 1,264 acre lake in Sawyer County, Wisconsin. The maximum depth is 21 feet and the average depth is 12 feet. Fish present in the lake are muskellunge, largemouth bass, smallmouth bass, northern pike and walleye. There is one public boat ramp on the west shore of the lake.

The lake is largely surrounded by the Chequamegon–Nicolet National Forest.

== See also ==
- List of lakes in Wisconsin
