= Friess Lake =

Lake in Washington County, Wisconsin

- Location within Wisconsin Location within the United States
- Location: Washington County, Wisconsin
- Coordinates: 43°14′40″N 88°16′35″W
- Type: Natural
- Basin countries: United States
- Surface area: 121 acres (490,000 m^{2})
- Max. depth: 48 ft (15 m)
- Surface elevation: 950 ft (290 m)

Friess Lake is a 121-acre lake in the Village of Richfield, in Washington County, Wisconsin. It is a recreational lake with sport fishing and it is a no-wake lake. Little Friess Lake is connected to Friess Lake by a small channel.

== History ==
The village of Richfield has six lakes and the largest one is Friess Lake. In 2008 the Wisconsin Department of Natural resources began trying to improve access to the lake. Grant money was used to make a boat launch on the 15-acre Little Friess Lake. Boaters can use the channel which leads from Little Friess to get to Friess Lake.

== See also ==
- List of lakes in Wisconsin
