= Wapogasset Lake =

Lake in the state of Wisconsin, United States

- Location within Wisconsin Location within the United States
- Location: Polk County, Wisconsin
- Coordinates: 45.3315809°N 92.4287938°W
- Type: Reservoir
- Primary inflows: Balsam Branch
- Primary outflows: Unnamed Creek
- Surface area: 1,189 acres (481 ha)
- Average depth: 17 feet (5.2 m)
- Max. depth: 32 feet (9.8 m)
- Surface elevation: 1,020 feet (310 m)
- Islands: 2 (Wallace and Unnamed Island)

Wapogasset Lake is a 1,189 acre lake in Polk County, Wisconsin. The maximum depth is 32 feet and the average depth is 17 feet. Fish present in the lake are muskellunge, largemouth bass, panfish, northern pike and walleye. There are two public boat ramps on the west shore of the lake.

There are two islands in the lake. Wapogasset Lake is connected to Bear Trap Lake on the south east corner. The inflow for Wapogasset Lake comes from the north through the Balsam Branch. This area is protected as part of the Balsam Branch Wildlife Area. The outflow for Wapogasset Lake is an unnamed creek near Lake Wapogasset Park. Water from Wapogasset Lake eventually flows into the Apple River.

== See also ==
- List of lakes in Wisconsin
