= Balsam Branch Wildlife Area =

Protected area in Wisconsin, US

- IUCN category V (protected landscape/seascape)
- Location within Wisconsin Location within the United States
- Location: Polk County, Wisconsin
- Nearest city: Balsam Lake, Wisconsin
- Coordinates: 45.363578°N 92.466321°W
- Area: 180 acres (73 ha)
- Established: 1967
- Governing body: Wisconsin Department of Natural Resources

The Balsam Branch Wildlife Area is a 180 acres (73 ha) tract of protected land in central Polk County, Wisconsin, managed by the Wisconsin Department of Natural Resources (WDNR). The wildlife area is characterized by marshland, prairie fields, and a pond set in the center of the property.

== Overview ==
In 1967, the entire plot of land was donated to the WDNR to be conserved, with a focus on the stock of turkey, deer, and various waterfowl native to Wisconsin. The property is frequented by birdwatchers.

The lake at the center of the property is unnamed, and has an area of 13 acres (5.3 ha). Water from the Wildlife area flows into Wapogasset Lake.
