= Lake Mallalieu =

Lake in Wisconsin, United States

Mallalieu Lake
- Location within Wisconsin Location within the United States
- Location: Saint Croix
- Coordinates: 44°59′24″N 92°44′37″W
- Surface area: 289 acres (117 ha)
- Average depth: 5 ft (1.5 m)
- Max. depth: 17 ft (5.2 m)
- Surface elevation: 682 ft (208 m)

Lake Mallalieu is located in St. Croix County, Wisconsin just inside of North Hudson, Wisconsin. The man-made lake is 289 acres (117 ha) with a maximum depth of 17 feet (5.2 m). It is a flowage lake almost on the Minnesota border connected to both the Willow River and the St. Croix River.

== History ==
The Willow River flows into Lake Mallalieu, and similar to the other rivers in the area, is a product of the continental glaciation. At the end of the Ice Age, a mile-thick massive ice sheet spread into Wisconsin until about 10,000 years ago when the warm climate forced it to retreat, creating the Willow River.

The Willow River, which would eventually be dammed creating Lake Mallalieu, carved channels around the lake and formed high surrounding banks. Vegetation stabilized the watershed, which reduced the erosion until the nineteenth century settlement.

== Early years ==
The first settlers of Hudson, French-Canadians brothers-in-law Louis Massey and Peter Bouchea, took up residence at the mouth of the Willow River in 1840. In 1848, the first dam and sawmill were built by James Purrington, creating a lake called Willow Pond. The settlement began to experience growth due to both the availability of steamboat and practical transportation via the nearby St. Croix River. In 1854, Caleb Greene built the second dam, known as “Brush Dam.” The dams were purchased by D.A. Baldwin of the West Wisconsin Railroad in 1867 and then again by Comstock and Clark.

In 1867, Henry and William Montman constructed a brewery on the south shore of the Willow Pond. The brewery was located on the site of the present day public boat launch, and made use of nearby caves for aging beer. After changing hands multiple times, the brewery burned down in 1917, but was never rebuilt due to prohibition.

== Middle years ==
In 1887, Willow Pond became what is now known as Lake Mallalieu. During this time, Dr. Irving Wiltrout constructed Hudson’s first hospital. In honor of this, the Hudson Star & Times proposed naming the lake “Lake Irving,” which the Irving declined, saying “I have named this lake in honor of Rev. William F. Mallalieu, D.D., L.L.D., Bishop of the Methodist church and a resident of New Orleans.”

By the 1890s, the Willow River had become known as a fine trout stream. A St. Paul group purchased a tract of land along the river below Willow Falls and established the exclusive Willow River Club, which was gated and controlled by members. A local by the name of Frank Wade challenged this due to disruption of fishing access. After being arrested for trespassing, he went on to win the case against the landowners. It was decided that “the Willow River was a public, navigable stream, and the defendant was not guilty of catching the fish in question.” This set a precedent for free use of the lake and streams to the public.

On April 5, 1934 the Willow River experienced a major flood, washing out dams upstream. The debris and floodwaters caused severe structural damage on Lake Mallalieu, including the bridge, railroad trestle, and the large dam on the St. Croix. This damage caused Lake Mallalieu to empty into the St. Croix River. The bridge and dams were replaced, and remain in the present day.

== Present ==
During the late 1950s, Mallalieu experienced significant residential development. Prior to this, there had only been a handful of houses and cottages constructed on the lake. In the 1960s, large parcels began being divided into lots, and new constructions have continued since.

Lake Mallalieu experienced a record flood in 1965. The lake rose three to four feet over its baseline water level, covering parts of adjacent Riverside Drive in nearly 2 feet of water. In the Spring of 2020 lake Mallalieu flooded again after the newly constructed Willow River Dam failed to contain flood waters following a large rainstorm. A significant community effort helped to remove boats and docks from the water to prevent property damage.

== Biology ==
Fish found in the Lake Mallalieu include Panfish, Largemouth Bass, Smallmouth Bass and Northern Pike. Several invasive flora and fauna have been encountered, including Curly-leaf Pondweed, Eurasion Watermilfoil, and Rusty Crayfish.
