= Red Lake (Douglas County, Wisconsin) =

Lake in the state of Wisconsin, United States

- Location within Wisconsin Location within the United States
- Location: Douglas County, Wisconsin
- Coordinates: 46°10′48″N 91°45′53″W
- Basin countries: United States
- Surface area: 258 acres (104 ha)
- Max. depth: 37 ft (11 m)
- Shore length^{1}: 3.5 mi (5.6 km)
- Surface elevation: 1,063 ft (324 m)
- ^{1} Shore length is not a well-defined measure.

Red Lake is a lake in Douglas County, Wisconsin, United States.
