= Jersey City Flowage =

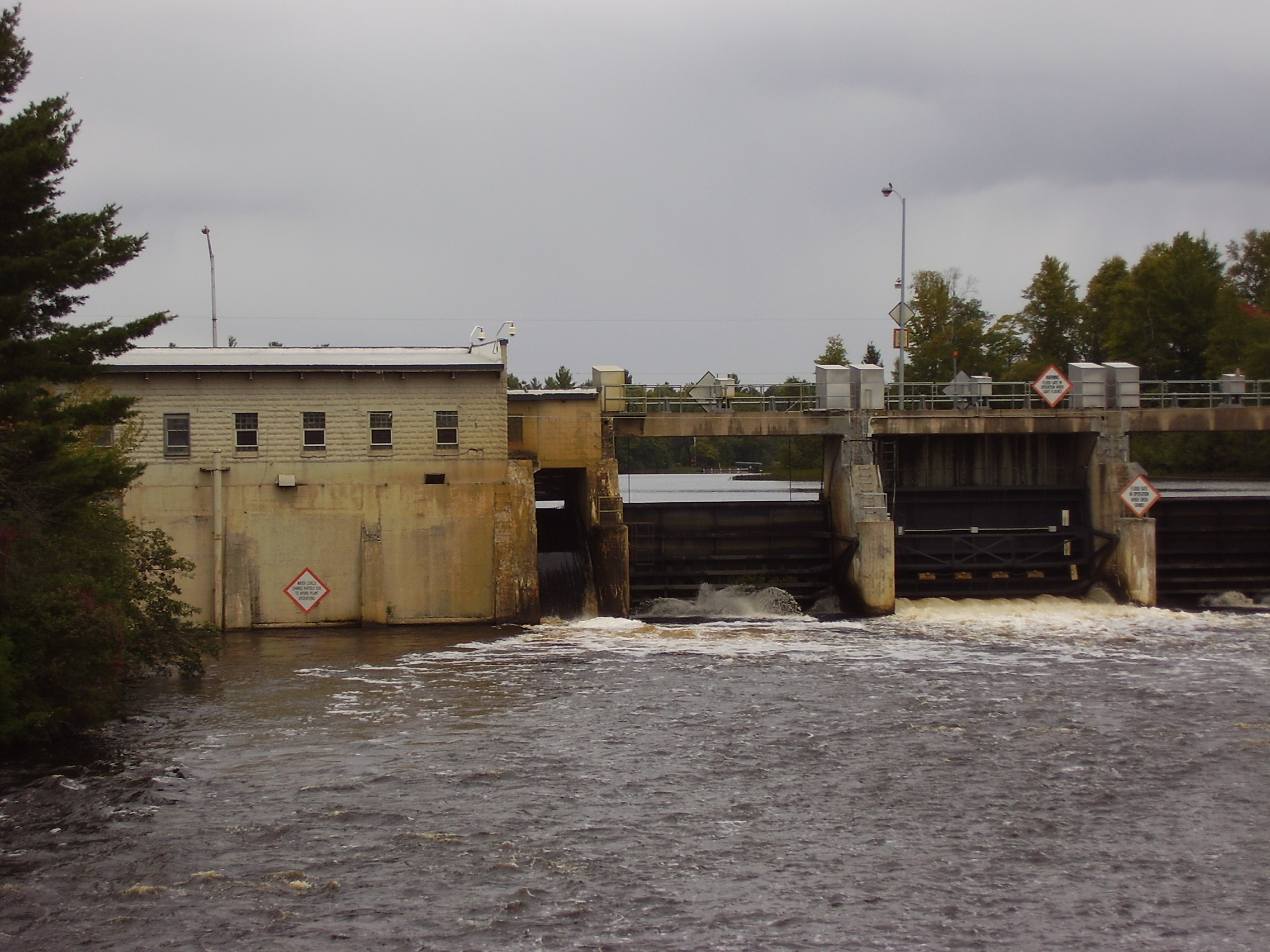
- Jersey City Dam with flowage seen through the gate opening

- Location within Wisconsin Location within the United States
- Location: Lincoln County, Wisconsin
- Coordinates: 45.491636°N 89.750139°W
- Type: reservoir
- Basin countries: United States
- Surface area: 423 acres (171 ha)
- Max. depth: 20 ft (6.1 m)
- Water volume: 1,794 acre⋅ft (2,213,000 m^{3})
- Shore length^{1}: 13.4 mi (21.6 km)
- Surface elevation: 1,437 ft (438 m)
- ^{1} Shore length is not a well-defined measure.

The Jersey City Flowage is an artificial lake on the Tomahawk River, located about one mile above the confluence with the Wisconsin River in Tomahawk, Wisconsin. The dam and the flow are controlled by the Wisconsin Valley Improvement Company. The dam was originally built in 1910 to provide power for a tannery. Jersey City Flowage is a 423 acre lake located in Lincoln County. It has a maximum depth of 20 feet.
