= Steele Lake (Wisconsin) =

Freshwater lake in Wisconsin, US

- Location of Steele Lake within Wisconsin
- Location: Douglas County, Wisconsin
- Coordinates: 46°30′47.8″N 91°45′46.4″W
- Type: Lake
- Primary outflows: Seepage
- Basin countries: United States
- Surface area: 152 acres (62 ha)
- Average depth: 2 feet (0.61 m)
- Max. depth: 8 feet (2.4 m)
- Surface elevation: 1,134 feet (346 m)
- Islands: 2
- Settlements: Lake Nebagamon

Steele Lake is a freshwater lake located in Douglas County, Wisconsin. It has a surface area of 152 acres, and is used for fishing. One can catch fish such as bluegill, northern pike and panfish. The bottom of the lake is mostly sand and muck, resulting in a trophic status assessed as eutrophic.
