= Wazeecha Lake =

Lake in the state of Wisconsin, United States

- Location within Wisconsin Location within the United States
- Location: Wood and Portage County, Wisconsin
- Coordinates: 44°21′54″N 89°44′49″W
- Type: reservoir
- Basin countries: United States
- Surface area: 140 acres (57 ha)
- Max. depth: 20 ft (6.1 m)
- Surface elevation: 1,014 ft (309 m)

Wazeecha Lake is a reservoir in the U.S. state of Wisconsin. The lake has a surface area of 140 acres (57 ha) and reaches a depth of 20 feet (6.1 m).

Lake Wazeecha was inundated in the 1930s by a dam on Fourmile Creek.
