= Kangaroo Lake (Wisconsin) =

Lake in Door County, Wisconsin, United States

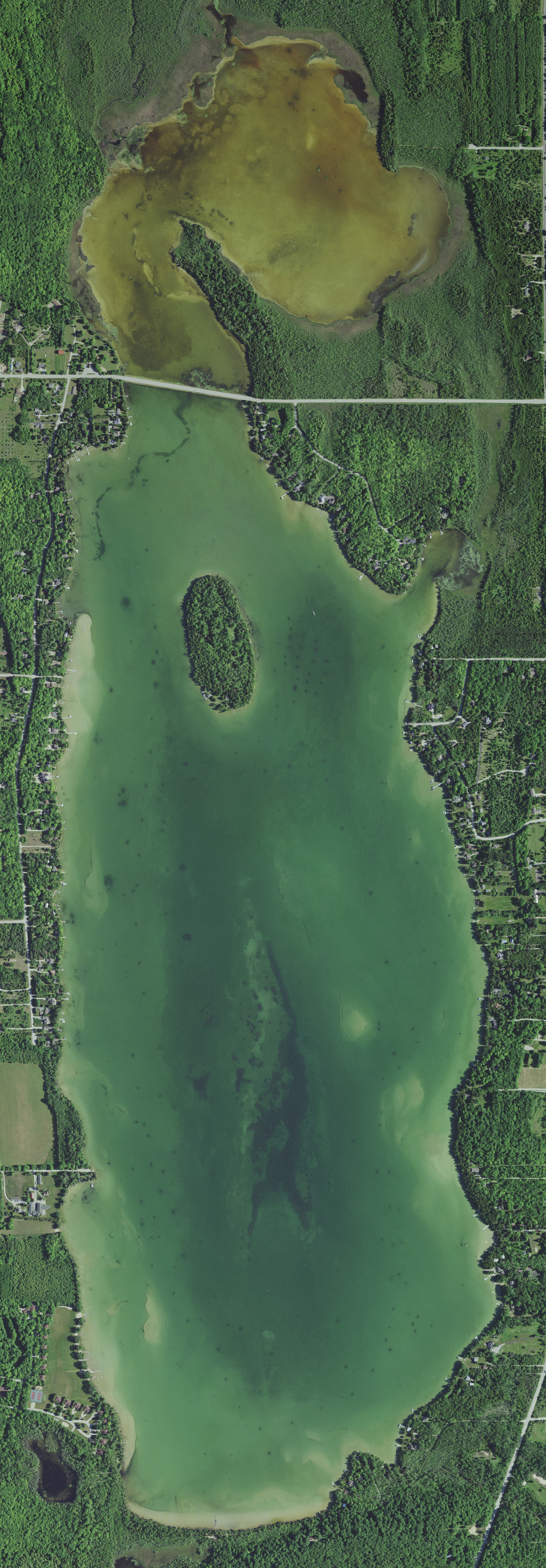
- Aerial view

- Location within Wisconsin Location within the United States
- Location: Door County, Wisconsin
- Coordinates: 45.032494°N 87.158995°W
- Primary inflows: Piel Creek
- Primary outflows: Heins Creek
- Basin countries: United States
- Surface area: 1,123 acres (454 ha)
- Average depth: 6 ft (1.8 m)
- Max. depth: 12 ft (3.7 m)
- Surface elevation: 598 ft (182 m)

Kangaroo Lake is the largest inland lake in Door County, Wisconsin, United States. It is located in the towns of Baileys Harbor and Jacksonport, and is the main feature of Kangaroo Lake State Natural Area.

The lake, located a half mile from Lake Michigan, is fed by Piel Creek and surrounded by a lowland marsh. The bottom of the lake is lined with marl. Many types of fish can be found in the lake.

Kangaroo Lake with Lake Michigan in the background taken from the Rushes Resort in Door County Wisconsin

The surrounding area is a tourist destination.

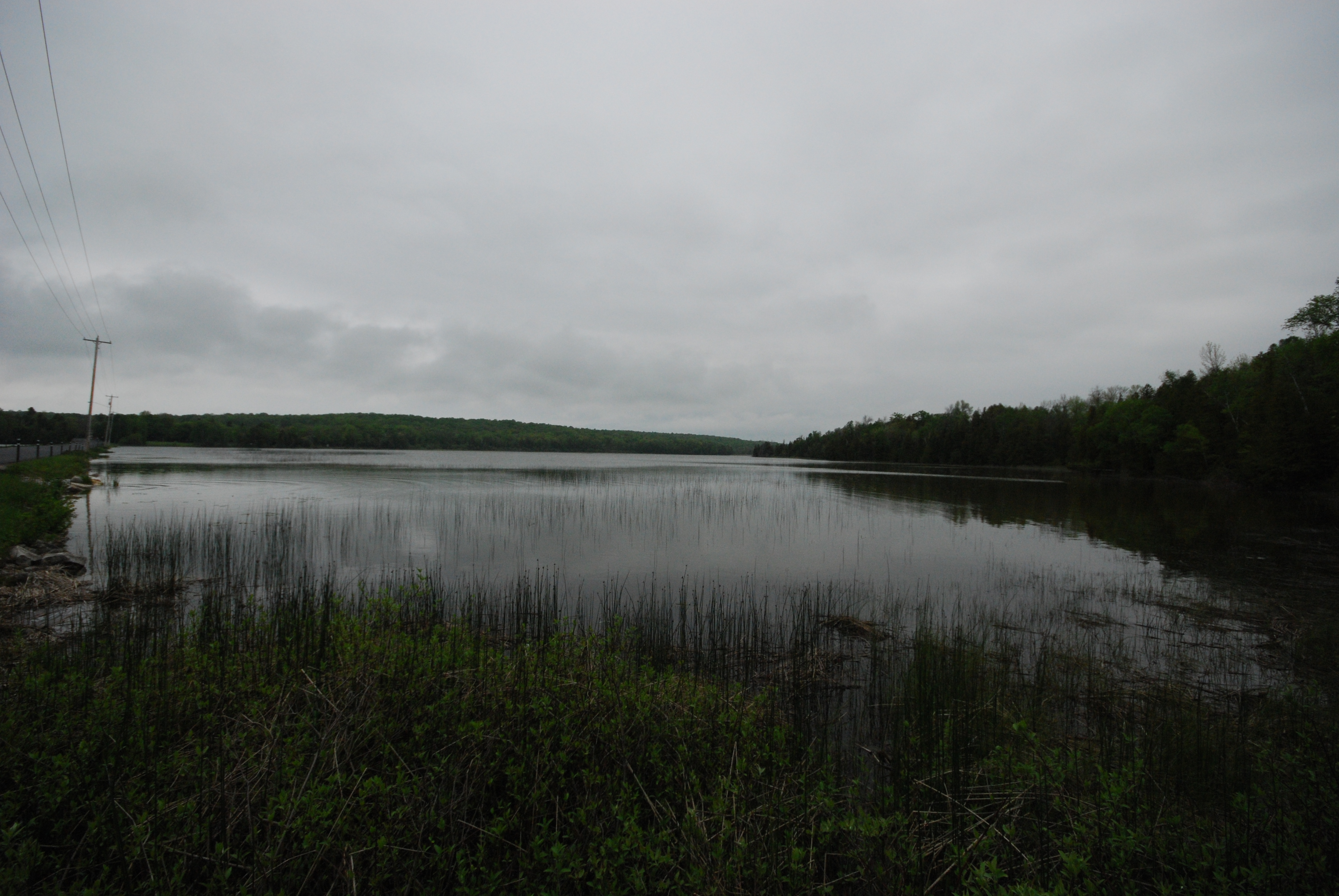
Kanagroo Lake in May

== See also ==
- List of lakes of Wisconsin § Door County
