= Two Sisters Lake =

Lake in the state of Wisconsin, United States

- Location within Wisconsin Location within the United States
- Location: Oneida County, Wisconsin
- Coordinates: 45.7711215°N 89.5266710°W
- Type: lake
- Surface area: 719 acres (2.91 km^{2})
- Max. depth: 63 feet (19 m)
- Surface elevation: 1,578 feet (481 m)
- Settlements: Newbold

Two Sisters Lake is a lake located in Newbold, Oneida County, Wisconsin. It is 719 acres (2.91 km^{2}) in size, and has a maximum depth of 63 feet (19 m). The lake is found at an elevation of 1,578 feet (481 m).
