= Franklin Lake (Wisconsin) =

Lake in Forest County, Wisconsin

- Interactive map of Franklin Lake
- Location: Forest County, Wisconsin
- Coordinates: 45.9355325°N 89.0013975°W
- Surface area: 839 acres (3.40 km^{2})
- Max. depth: 46 feet (14 m)
- Surface elevation: 519 meters (1,703 ft)
- References: U.S. Geological Survey Geographic Names Information System: Franklin Lake (Wisconsin)

Franklin Lake is an 839-acre (3.40 km^{2}) lake located in Forest County, Wisconsin, with a maximum depth of 46 feet (14 m). The lake is located in the middle of the Nicolet National Forest. Fish species reported by the Wisconsin Department of Natural Resources include panfish, smallmouth bass, walleye, largemouth bass and northern pike.
