= List of Wisconsin fishing records =

All fish caught were in the waters of the state of Wisconsin.

This is a list of fishing records in the state of Wisconsin. All records are fish caught by use of hook and line and are handled by the Wisconsin Department of Natural Resources. This list is up to date as of June 10, 2026.

Species name	Weight	Length in inches	Date	Location	County
Alewife	0 lbs. 3.2 oz.	9	05/12/2023	Lake Michigan	Milwaukee
Bass, Largemouth	11 lbs. 3 oz.	not available	10/12/1940	Lake Ripley	Jefferson
Bass, Smallmouth	9 lbs. 1 oz.	not available	06/21/1950	Indian Lake	Oneida
Bass, Rock	2 lbs. 15 oz.	not available	06/02/1990	Shadow Lake	Waupaca
Bass, Hybrid Striped	13 lbs. 14.2 oz.	28.0	03/16/2002	Columbia Lake	Columbia
Bass, Striped	1 lbs. 9.3 oz.	17.0	05/24/1996	Fox River	Kenosha
Bass, White	5 lbs. 3.8 oz.	22.25	05/05/2019	Mississippi River	Vernon
Bass, Yellow	2 lbs. 13.8 oz.	16.5	04/22/2025	Lake Mendota	Dane
Blackstripe Topminnow	0 lbs. 0.32 oz.	2.4	08/01/2019	Mukwonago River	Waukesha
Bluegill	2 lbs. 9.8 oz.	12.0	08/02/1995	Green Bay	Brown
Bowfin	13 lbs. 1 oz.	31.6	07/19/1980	Willow Flowage	Oneida
Buffalo, Bigmouth	76 lbs. 8 oz.	49.5	06/21/2013	Petenwell Lake	Adams
Buffalo, Smallmouth	20 lbs 0 oz.	30.0	12/03/1999	Milwaukee River	Washington
Bullhead, Black	5 lbs. 8 oz.	21.5	09/02/1989	Big Falls Flowage	Rusk
Bullhead, Brown	4 lbs. 2 oz.	17.5	07/07/2006	Little Green Lake	Green Lake
Bullhead, Yellow	4 lbs. 5 oz.	19.5	08/06/2021	White Mound Park Lake	Sauk
Burbot	18 lbs. 2oz.	37.8	02/02/2002	Lake Superior	Bayfield
Carp, Bighead	67 lbs. 3.2 oz.	49.5	04/29/2022	Wisconsin River	Sauk
Carp, Common	57 lbs. 2 oz.	not available	08/28/1966	Lake Wisconsin	Columbia
Carpsucker, Quillback	13 lbs. 8.8 oz.	24.75	04/23/2024	Wolf River	Waupaca
Catfish, Channel	44 lbs. 0 oz.	not available	1962	Wisconsin River	Columbia
Catfish, Flathead	74 lbs. 5.1 oz.	53.0	03/30/2001	Mississippi River	Vernon
Chub, Creek	0 lbs.12.0 oz.	11.75	01/07/2018	Amnicon Lake	Douglas
Chub, Hornyhead	0 lbs. 7.3 oz.	10.63	04/11/2024	Little Platte River	Grant
Cisco	4 lbs. 12.8 oz.	22	03/28/2023	Chain O' Lakes	Waupaca
Crappie, Black	4 lbs. 8 oz.	19.75	08/12/1967	Gile Flowage	Iron
Crappie, White	3 lb. 13.1 oz.	16.5	05/04/2003	Cranberry Marsh	Monroe
Darter, Johnny	0 lb. 0.16 oz.	2.5	08/29/2020	Menomonee River	Waukesha
Drum, (Sheepshead)	35 lbs. 4 oz.	37.5	08/29/1992	Mississippi River	Crawford
Eel, American	3 lbs. 6 oz.	38.25	07/09/1997	Lake Superior	Ashland
Gar, Longnose	21 lbs. 4 oz.	52.5	06/14/1990	Wisconsin River	Richland
Gar, Shortnose	4 lbs. 5.4 oz	31.75	08/22/2015	Fox River	Outagamie
Goby, Round	0 lb. 5.3 oz	8.5	05/11/2008	Lake Michigan	Manitowoc
Logperch	0 lbs. 0.80 oz.	4.8	09/09/2023	Lake Winnebago	Fond du Lac
Minnow, Bluntnose	0 lbs. 0.4 oz.	2.7	08/01/2019	Mukwonago River	Waukesha
Muskellunge	69 lbs. 11 oz.	63.5	10/20/1949	Chippewa Flowage	Sawyer
Muskellunge, Tiger	51 lbs. 3 oz.	54.0	07/16/1919	Lac Vieux Desert	Vilas
Northern Pike	38 lbs. 0 oz.	not available	08/06/1952	Lake Puckaway	Green Lake
Perch, White	1 lbs. 9.6 oz.	13.75	11/01/2023	Green Bay	Door
Perch, Yellow	3 lbs. 4 oz.	not available	1954	Lake Winnebago	Winnebago
Pumpkinseed	1 lb. 3.4 oz.	11.125	05/31/2020	Silver Lake	Washington
Redhorse, Golden	5 lbs. 2.2 oz.	24.0	04/21/2022	Mississippi River	La Crosse
Redhorse, Greater	10 lbs. 10.4 oz.	28.75	05/16/2024	Yellow River	Burnett
Redhorse, Shorthead	4 lbs. 5.4 oz.	22	09/17/2025	Wisconsin River	Sauk
Redhorse, Silver	11 lbs. 7 oz.	29.25	05/29/1985	Plum Creek	Vilas
Rudd, European	1 lb. 3 oz.	12.6	03/10/1991	North Lake	Waukesha
Salmon, Atlantic	23 lbs. 15 oz.	37.0	07/18/1980	Lake Michigan	Milwaukee
Salmon, Coho	26 lbs. 1.9 oz.	38.0	08/21/1999	Lake Michigan	Milwaukee
Salmon, Chinook	44 lbs. 15 oz.	47.5	07/19/1994	Lake Michigan	Door
Salmon, Kokanee	2 lbs. 8.2 oz.	19.5	09/01/2007	Upper Bass Lake	Menominee
Salmon, Pink	6 lbs. 1.9 oz.	24.0	08/10/1999	Lake Michigan	Kewaunee
Salmon, Pinook (chinook x pink)	12 lbs. 7.4 oz.	29.5	08/14/2022	Lake Michigan	Kewaunee
Sauger	6 lbs. 6.7 oz.	23.25	03/19/2009	Mississippi River	Pierce
Saugeye	8 lbs. 14.7 oz.	28.5	10/14/2009	Wisconsin River	Columbia
Sculpin, Mottled	0 lbs. 1.1 oz.	5.25	09/12/2022	Rush River	St. Croix
Sculpin, Slimy	0 lbs. 0.8 oz.	4.75	05/21/2016	Kinnickinnic River	St. Croix
Shad, Gizzard	4 lbs. 7 oz.	21.5	02/10/1982	Lake Michigan	Ozaukee
Shiner, Common	0 lbs. 4.0 oz.	8.0	04/23/2017	Mukwonago River	Waukesha
Shiner, Golden	0 lbs. 9.1 oz.	10.25	03/09/2021	Lake Mendota	Dane
Shiner, Spottail	0 lbs. 0.80 oz.	5.25	05/20/2024	Sugar Creek	Door
Smelt, Rainbow	0 lbs. 5.5 oz.	11.5	02/03/2022	Green Bay	Door
Stonecat	0 lbs.5.4 oz.	9.3	07/04/2017	Prairie River	Lincoln
Sturgeon, Lake	170 lbs. 10 oz.	79.0	09/22/1979	Yellow Lake	Burnett
Sturgeon, Shovelnose	7 lbs. 13.1 oz.	37.5	05/28/2017	Mississippi River	Vernon
Sucker, Longnose	4 lbs. 1 oz.	21.75	04/12/2025	Menominee River	Marinette
Sucker, Northern Hog	1 lb. 13 oz.	16.0	03/17/2004	Fox River	Green Lake
Sucker, Spotted	4 lbs. 10.2 oz.	20.5	02/22/2018	Lake Onalaska	La Crosse
Sucker, White	6 lbs. 2 oz.	23.1	08/27/1997	Miller Flowage	Taylor
Sunfish, Green	1 lb. 9 oz.	not available	08/23/1967	Wind Lake	Racine
Sunfish, Orangespotted	0 lbs. 0.48 oz.	3.25	06/15/2024	Crawfish River	Dodge
Trout, Brook (inland)	9 lbs. 15 oz.	not available	09/02/1944	Prairie River	Lincoln
Trout, Brook (outlying)	10 lbs. 1 oz.	24.5	06/08/1999	Lake Michigan	Ozaukee
Trout, Brown (inland)	18 lbs. 6 oz.	34.3	05/07/1984	Lake Geneva	Walworth
Trout, Brown (outlying)	41 lbs. 8 oz.	40.6	07/16/2010	Lake Michigan	Racine
Trout, Lake (inland)	35 lbs. 4 oz.	not available	06/01/1957	Big Green Lake	Green Lake
Trout, Lake (outlying)	47 lbs. 0 oz.	not available	09/09/1946	Lake Superior	Bayfield
Trout, Rainbow (outlying)	27 lbs. 2 oz.	42.5	07/26/1997	Lake Michigan	Kewaunee
Trout, Rainbow (inland)	12 lbs. 3 oz.	29.5	06/15/2006	Elbow Lake	Marinette
Trout, Splake (Lk x Bk)	17 lbs. 14.5 oz.	32.0	07/06/2002	Green Bay	Marinette
Trout, Tiger (Bk x Br, outlying)	20 lbs. 13 oz.	33.75	08/12/1978	Lake Michigan	Sheboygan
Trout, Tiger (Bk x Br, inland)	2 lb. 1 oz.	16.0	04/09/2018	Private pond	Racine
Walleye	18 lbs. 0 oz.	not available	09/16/1933	High Lake	Vilas
Warmouth	1 lb. 1 oz.	10.50	05/26/2001	Eagle Lake	Racine
Whitefish, Lake	12 lbs. 6.4 oz.	31.0	07/09/2013	Lake Michigan	Sheboygan

== See also ==
- Door Peninsula § Waters
- Kewaunee County, Wisconsin § Fishing and boating
- Lake Winnebago § Fishing
- Hadland Fishing Camp
- National Fresh Water Fishing Hall of Fame
- Manitou Camp
