= Little Green Lake =

Lake in Wisconsin, United States

- Location within Wisconsin Location within the United States
- Location: Green Lake County, Wisconsin
- Coordinates: 43.7368150°N 88.9845626°W
- Basin countries: United States
- Surface area: 462 acres (0.722 sq mi; 1.87 km^{2})
- Average depth: 10 ft (3.0 m)
- Max. depth: 28 ft (8.5 m)
- Water volume: 4,816.8 acre⋅ft (5,941,400 m^{3})
- Shore length^{1}: 4.2 mi (6.8 km)
- Surface elevation: 922 feet (281 m)
- Islands: one unnamed
- ^{1} Shore length is not a well-defined measure.

Little Green Lake is a lake located in Green Lake County, Wisconsin. It has a surface area of 462 acres (1.87 km^{2}) and a max depth of 28 ft (8.5 m). Little Green Lake lies just over three miles to the south of Wisconsin's deepest natural lake, Green Lake. There is one unnamed island that is 0.3 acres (0.0012 km^{2}) in size. Little Green Lake is about a mile north of Markesan.

In 2006, the Wisconsin state record Brown Bullhead was caught in Little Green Lake. It was 17.5 inches (44 cm) long and weighed 4 pounds 2 ounces (1.9 kg).

== See also ==
List of lakes of Wisconsin
