= Puckaway Lake =

Lake in Wisconsin

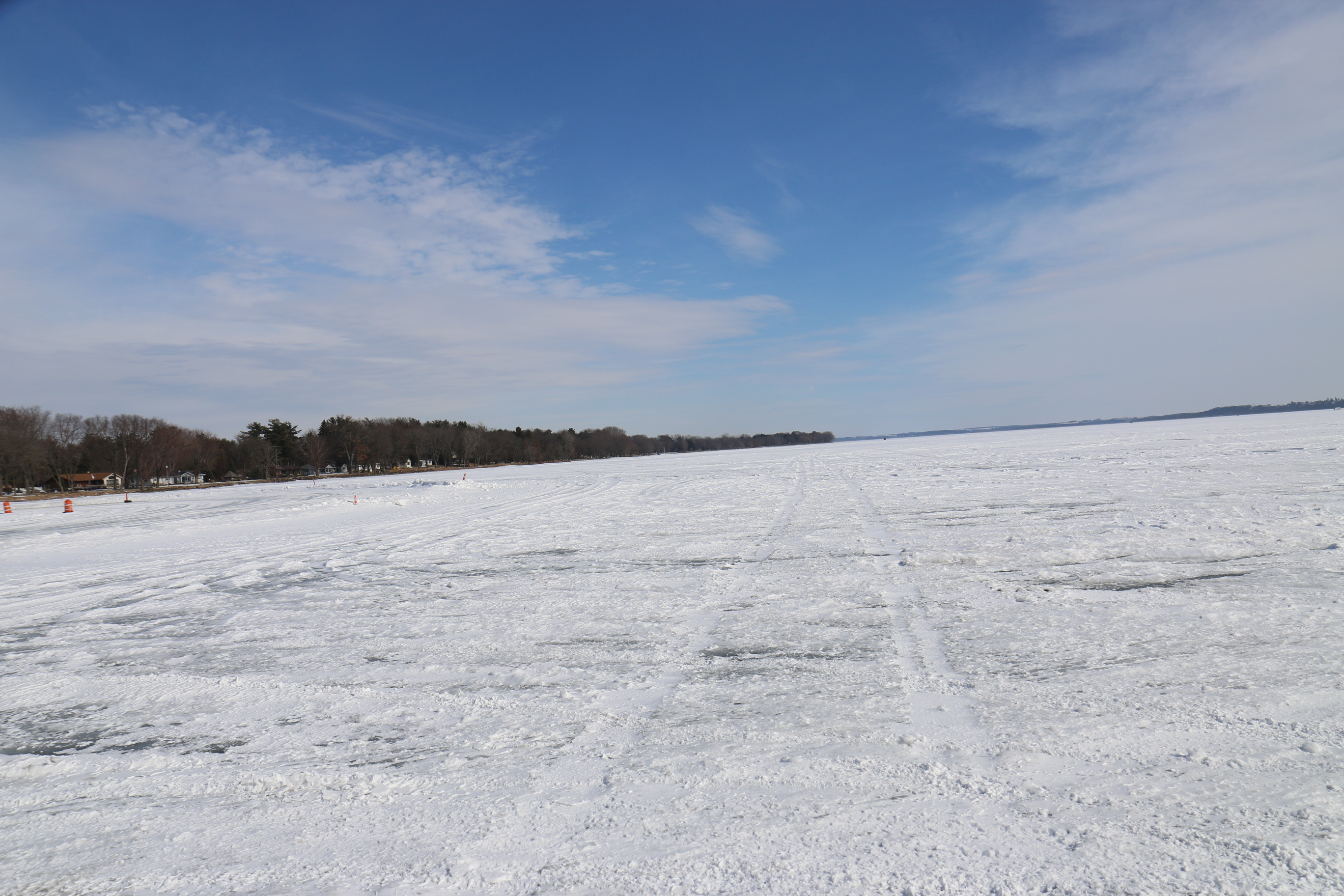
- Frozen Puckaway Lake in February 2018

- Location within Wisconsin Location within the United States
- Location: Green Lake County and Marquette County, Wisconsin
- Coordinates: 43.755656°N 89.1967752°W
- Etymology: Native American word meaning "wild rice field"
- Part of: Fox–Wisconsin Waterway
- Primary inflows: Fox River
- Primary outflows: Fox River
- Basin countries: United States
- Max. length: 27 mi (43 km)
- Surface area: 5,013 acres (7.833 sq mi; 20.29 km^{2})
- Average depth: 3 ft (0.91 m)
- Max. depth: 5 ft (1.5 m)
- Water volume: 15,327 acre⋅ft (18,906,000 m^{3})
- Shore length^{1}: 27.6 mi (44.4 km) and 6.2 mi (10.0 km) for islands
- Surface elevation: 764 feet (233 m)
- Islands: Zacharias Island
- Settlements: Marquette
- ^{1} Shore length is not a well-defined measure.

Puckaway Lake also referred to as Lake Puckaway is a lake in Green Lake County and Marquette County, Wisconsin. The lake has a surface area of 5,013 acres (20.29 km^{2}) and a max depth of 5 ft (1.5 m). Most of the lake has a muck bottom and is shallow with an average depth of 3 ft (0.91 m).

== History ==
In 1673, French explorer Jacques Marquette, made a passage through the Fox–Wisconsin Waterway from Green Bay to the Mississippi River. Travelling through Puckaway Lake, he stated "the route is broken by so many swamps and small lakes that it is easy to lose one'sway, especially as the river is so full of wild rice that it is difficult to find the channel." Puckaway Lake is a natural formed lake however, the water level has been raised. In 1897, a lock and dam was built on the Fox River by the United States Army Corps of Engineers, eight miles downstream from the lake near Princeton. This was done with hopes of raising the water level enough for commercial use of the river. By 1922, it was realized that this would not be feasible, and the lock was decommissioned however the dam remains.

== Recreation ==
There are seven public boat landings around the lake.

=== Fishing ===
Recreational fishing is frequent on Puckaway Lake. The Wisconsin Department of Natural Resources lists six different species of fish in the lake: Musky, Panfish, Largemouth Bass, Northern Pike, Walleye and Catfish. In 1952, the state record 38 lb (17 kg) northern pike was caught on Puckaway Lake.

=== Invasive Species ===
First observed in 1984, invasive species have been found in Puckaway Lake. There are Brittle Waternymph, Curly-Leaf Pondweed, Eurasian Water-Milfoil, Hybrid Eurasian / Northern Water-Milfoil, and Viral Hemorrhagic Septicemia. To stop the spread of invasive species in the Fox River Waterway, multiple locks have been permanently closed. This has been done to prevent other invasive species from the Great Lakes.

== See also ==
List of lakes of Wisconsin
