= Fox–Wisconsin Waterway =

Waterway formed by the Fox and Wisconsin Rivers

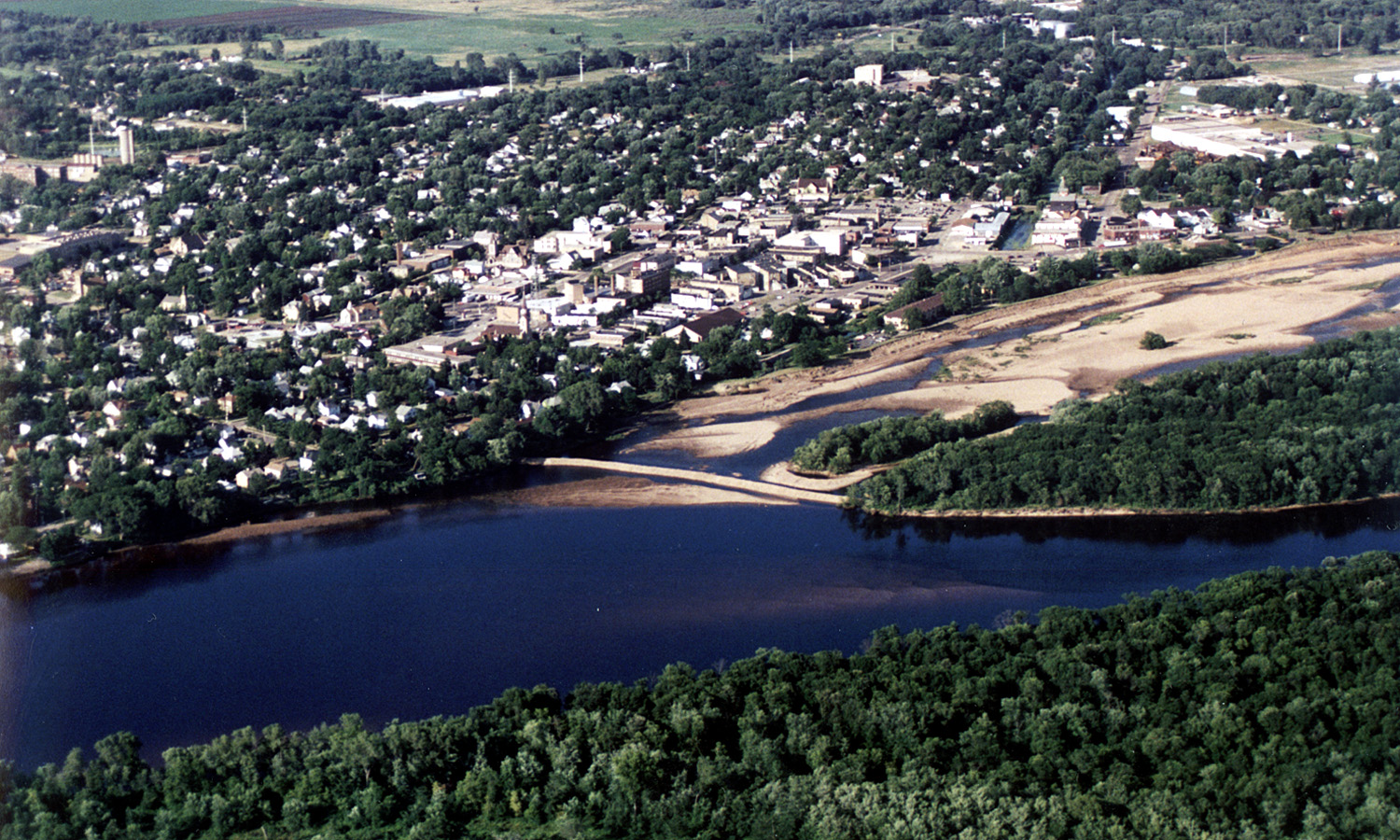
Aerial view of Portage, Wisconsin. The western end of the Portage Canal is visible at the upper right in the picture.

The Fox–Wisconsin Waterway is a United States waterway formed by the Fox and Wisconsin Rivers. First used by European settlers in 1673 during the expedition of Marquette and Jolliet, it was one of the principal routes used by travelers between the Great Lakes and the Mississippi River until the completion of the Illinois and Michigan Canal in 1848 and the arrival of railroads. The western terminus of the Fox–Wisconsin Waterway was at the Mississippi at Prairie du Chien, Wisconsin. It continued up the Wisconsin River about 116 miles (187 km) until reaching Portage, Wisconsin. There travelers would portage to the Upper Fox River, or eventually, use the Portage Canal. It continued about 160 miles (260 km) down the Fox River, following it through Lake Winnebago and continuing on the Lower Fox over 170 feet (50 m) of falls to the eastern terminus of Green Bay.

In the mid-19th century, the waterway was improved with numerous locks, dams and canals, including the 2-mile-long (3.2 km) Portage Canal between the Fox and Wisconsin Rivers. All the locks were not completed until 1876, well after the Illinois and Michigan Canal and at the point where the move from canals to railroads was in full swing. Later development on the waterway introduced barriers to navigation, such as the Prairie du Sac Dam. Use of the waterway was never substantial and it slowly died out. The Portage Canal was closed in 1951 and most of the Upper Fox River locks and dams fell into disuse. The lock system on the Lower Fox River, from Lake Winnebago to Green Bay, was closed in 1983 to prevent the upstream spread of invasive species such as the lamprey.

The Fox-Wisconsin is no longer used as a transportation route between the Mississippi River and the Great Lakes. However, parts of the waterway enjoy significant recreational use. 16 of the 17 locks on the lower Fox river have been restored to operation. The lock at Rapide Croche has been permanently sealed as a lamprey barrier as required by state law, so the lock system will not be fully restored, but a boat transfer system at Rapide Croche has been proposed as an alternative to restore navigation on the lower Fox river.

Longitudinal Cross section of Fox Wisconsin Waterway from Prairie du Chien to Green Bay, Wisconsin

== Reaches ==
The Waterway can be divided into four physical reaches: the Lower Wisconsin River, "The Portage" canal and locks at Portage, the Upper Fox River and the Lower Fox River.

== Physical description ==
Overall the system is about 280 miles (450 km) long. It begins in the west at the Mississippi River, rises at a nearly constant rate to Portage, crosses the Great-Lakes/Mississippi River divide at Portage, descends slowly along the Upper Fox to the Lake Winnebago Pool and then plunges in a short reach to the eastern end at the head of Green Bay on Lake Michigan.

=== Lower Wisconsin ===
The lower Wisconsin River flows through glacial drift until it enters the Driftless Area and eventually reaches the Mississippi River. It extends about 116 river miles (187 river kilometers) from Portage to its confluence with the Mississippi River, falling 171 feet (52 m) from about elevation 782 feet (238 m) above sea level (msl) at Portage to 611 feet (186 m), msl at the Mississippi.

The reach has nearly uniform hydraulic gradient of about 1.5 feet per mile (0.3 m/km). There is only one major tributary, the Kickapoo River, which enters just before the Mississippi at about River Mile 16 (River km 26). Since there are no major tributaries, river discharge in the reach is relatively constant, averaging about 8,700 cubic feet per second (250 m^{3}/s) at USGS gage 05407000 at Muscoda.

The river channel is dominated by sand. Sand bars, tow-head islands and new, multiple channels form often and constantly change. The channel is wide and shallow.

=== The Portage ===
The 2-mile (3.2 km) portage at Portage, Wisconsin is not unique as a passage between the Great Lakes and Mississippi River watersheds. Similar passages exist all along the watershed divide, for instance, at Chicago and in the northern Indiana area. What is unique is that, while the Fox is a small stream—typical of such passages—the Wisconsin is a large river, already over 300 miles (480 km) long. The divide between the two rivers has little grade change, although it is marshy. The Wisconsin occasionally flowed across the Portage into the Fox during high water. The Fox and Wisconsin have modified their courses and outlets over geological time and it is likely that either river has flowed into either watershed. Only about 2 miles (3.2 km) separate the two rivers. The Fox River end of the canal is at about elevation 780 feet (240 m) msl. The Wisconsin River end is slightly higher, depending on Wisconsin River discharge levels. The Portage lies about 116 river miles (187 km) from the Mississippi River and 162 river miles (261 km) from Green Bay.

=== Upper Fox ===
The upper Fox River flows northwest from its headwater to within 2 miles (3 km) of the Portage. It then flows to the north-northeast to the Lake Winnebago Pool. It extends about 110 river miles (177 km) from Portage to Lake Winnebago, falling only about 36 feet (11 m) from elevation 782 feet (238 m), msl at the Portage to 746 feet (227 m), msl at Lake Winnebago.

The reach has a shallow grade. The hydraulic gradient averages about 4 inches per mile (0.06 m/km). There are two very shallow lakes along the way, Buffalo Lake and Puckaway Lake. The river drainage area grows significantly in size from 80 square miles (210 km^{2}) at the Portage to about 1,340 square miles (3,500 km^{2}) at USGS gage 004073500 at Berlin, where the average flow is about 1,140 cubic feet per second (32 m^{3}/s). The river discharge would grow at nearly the same proportions. Thus the Upper Fox grows from a small stream to a small river over its course. At Big Lake Butte des Morts it is joined from the north by flow from the Wolf River through Lake Poygan. The drainage area of Wolf River is more than twice the size of the drainage area of the Fox. But this extra flow joins the Fox only after it reaches the Lake Winnebago Pool.

The river channel is characterized by sand, silt and organic material. The channel, which ranges from 70 to 300 feet (20–90 m), is shallow and generally widens and deepens as it approaches Lake Winnebago.

=== Lower Fox ===
The lower Fox River flows from the natural impoundment of Lake Winnebago to Lake Michigan. It extends about 39 river miles (63 km) from Menasha at the head of Lake Winnebago to Lake Michigan, falling 169 feet (52 m) from about elevation 746 feet (227 m), msl at Winnebago to 577 feet (176 m), msl at Green Bay. The reach has a very steep and changing grade. While the hydraulic gradient averages about 4 feet per mile (0.75 m/km), there are very large falls at (using the original French nomenclature) La Grand Kaukilin (Kaukauna), La Petite Chute (Little Chute) and La Grand Chute (Appleton). The total drop of these falls is approximately the same as Niagara Falls, although over a much longer stretch.

There are no major tributaries. Thus the river discharge is nearly constant, averaging about 4,600 cubic feet per second (130 m^{3}/s) at USGS gage 040851385 at Green Bay.

== History prior to modifications ==
The reach served as a highway for Native American peoples and, later, European explorers and fur traders both indigenous and European. They used the Fox and Wisconsin rivers as a primary highway between the Great Lakes and Mississippi River. In fact, it was the most heavily traveled of all the portages between the Great Lakes and Mississippi watersheds. From the Portage, one could travel north to nearly Lake Superior along the Upper Wisconsin River, west to the Mississippi along the Lower Wisconsin River, or northeast along the Fox River to Lake Michigan. Other watersheds, such as the Wolf River to north central Wisconsin or the Rock River to the Illinois country, were within easy distance.

In the 17th century the area was dominated by a number of tribes, Ho-Chunk, Menominee, Kickapoo and Ojibwe tribes among them.

The earliest French explorers were Father Marquette and Joliet in the summer of 1673. The French controlled the area for roughly 100 years until the end of the French and Indian War. Pressures from the French colonization of the eastern St Lawrence River and Great Lakes region eventually forced the Sauk and Meskwaki peoples to the region, displacing the original tribes. The Sauk and Meskwaki, realizing the importance of the Waterway, set up toll stations at portage locations. The French, resentful of lost trade, engaged the Meskwaki in a series of wars known as the Fox Wars.

French traders dominated the Waterway. They set up forts or settlements at La Baye (Green Bay), Portage (eventually Fort Winnebago), and Prairie du Chien. Their influence is apparent from the remaining place names and features: Prairie du Chien, Portage, De Pere, and Lake Butte des Morts to name a few. In fact, property in parts of Prairie du Chien, Portage, Kaukauna and Green Bay, all along the Waterway, still use French long-lot descriptions. All four cities are among the oldest in Wisconsin and the region.

The British officially controlled the area until the end of the American Revolutionary War and nominally until the end of the War of 1812, after which the American government was in firm control. The Fox were not totally displaced from the Waterway until 1832, when American troops forced them out during the Blackhawk War.

== Modifications ==
The arrival of steamships to the region and the success of eastern canal systems, especially the Erie Canal, prompted various groups to look for improvements to the Waterway. In fact, there was great speculative pressure to capitalize on the natural extension of the Erie Canal to the Mississippi and beyond. Into the 1850s, most products from the Midwest traveled the long journey down the Mississippi and east from New Orleans. This shipment was expensive, absorbed farmers' profits and retarded economic growth. Promotion of the Portage Canal pointed to the economic advantage of a direct waterway connecting the Great Lakes to the Mississippi to spur local economic growth.

The earliest improvements along the Fox–Wisconsin Waterway began with a canal and lock at Portage. In 1829, Morgan Martin founded the Summit Portage Canal and Road Company to build the Portage canal. Chronically short of funds and impacted by depression in the 1830s, the company failed to complete the canal by 1838. About the same time, Congress had the Corps of Engineers (Corps) review the situation. It was recognized that the work would not only include a canal at Portage, but improvements along the length of both rivers between their mouths and the canal. In 1837 and 1839, the Corps examined the waterway's feasibility and recommended a "slack-water" (lock and dam) system. After numerous memorials from the territorial legislature, Congress authorized a land grant for the waterway project in 1846. There were various private companies formed to promote and build the Waterway; besides the Summit Portage company, there were the Fox and Wisconsin Improvement and the Green Bay and Mississippi Canal Companies. In 1872, the Corps assumed supervision of the waterway.

Postcards from 1867-1870 for various towns along the waterway. Note the prominence of steamboats.

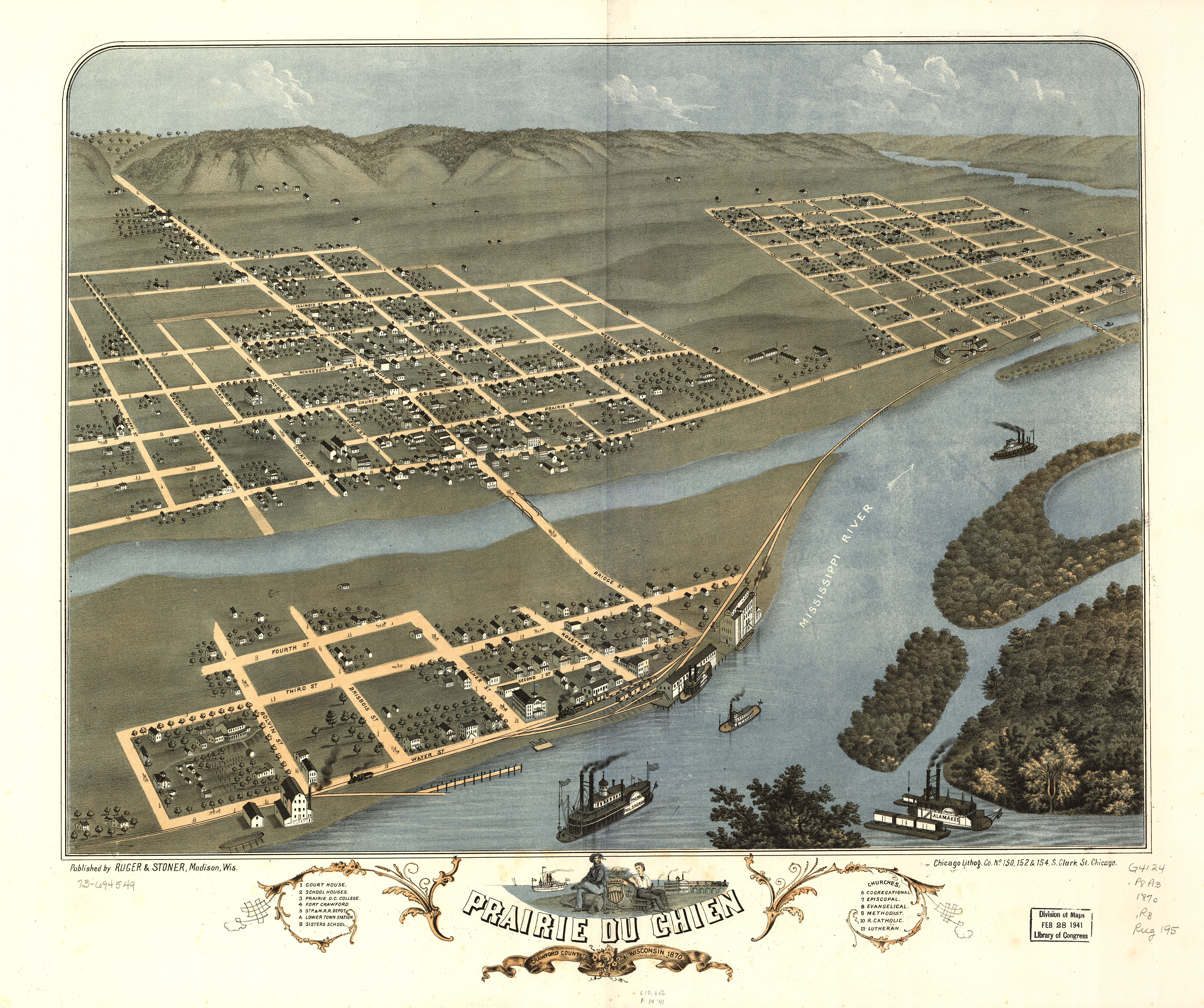
Prairie du Chien

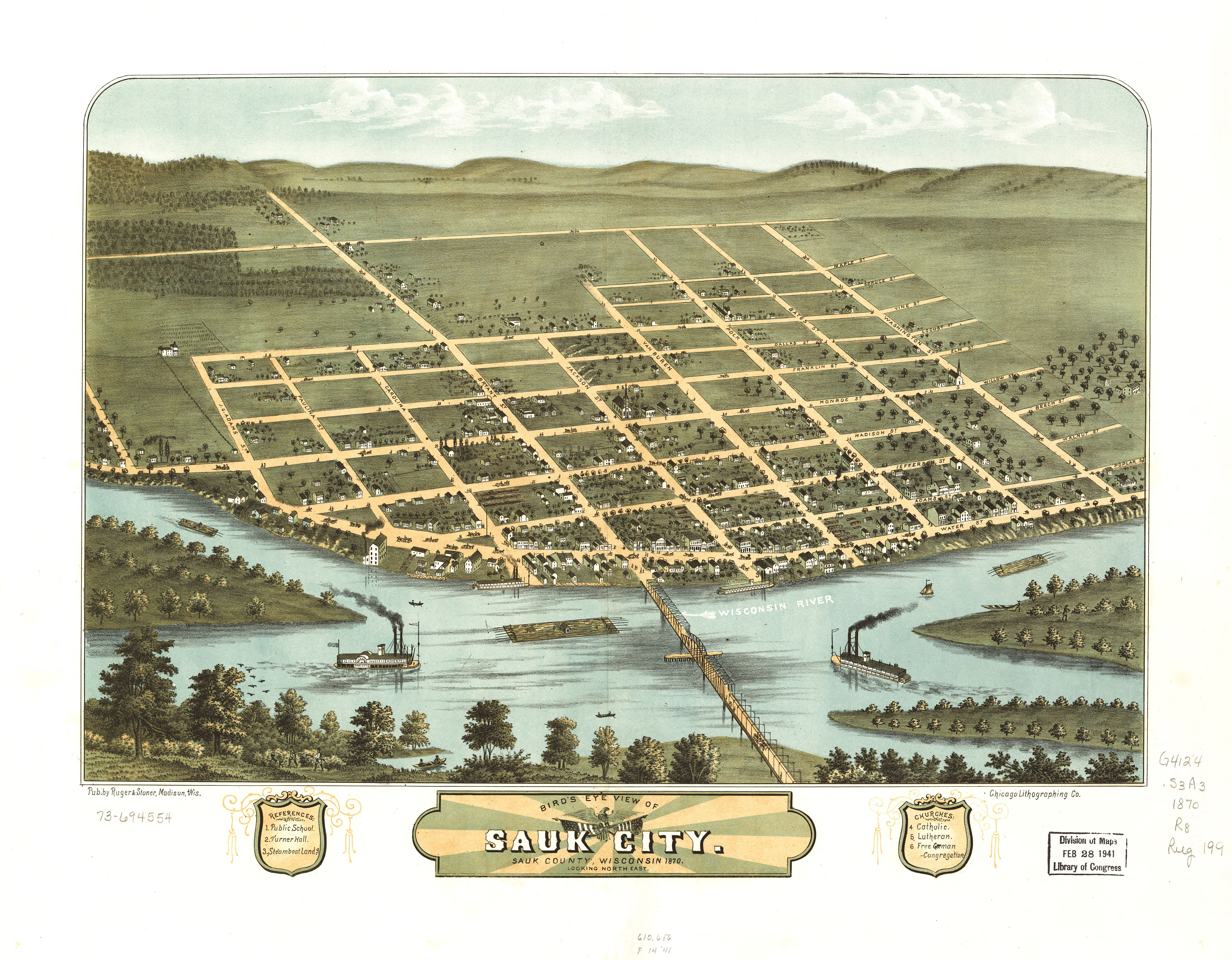
Sauk City

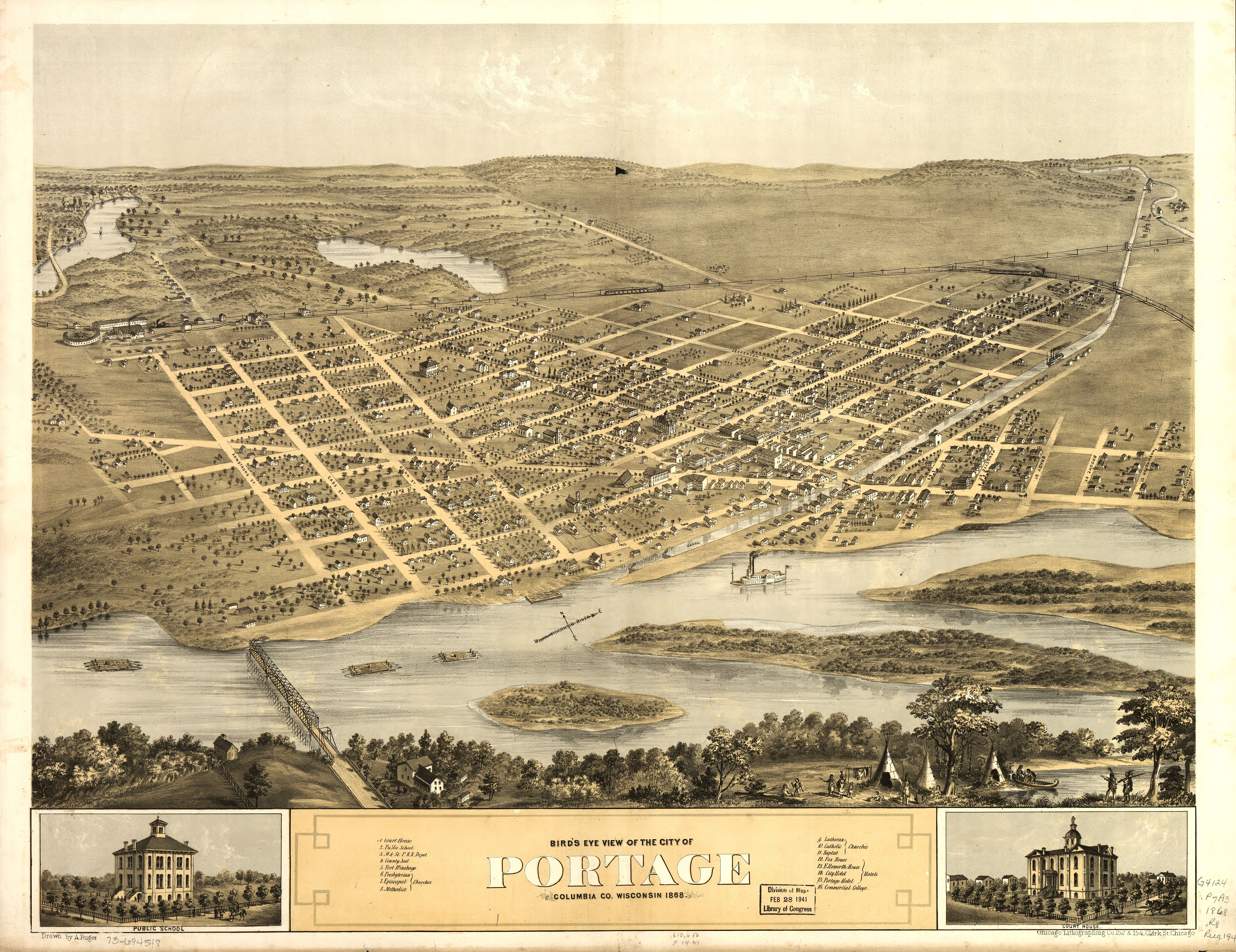
Portage

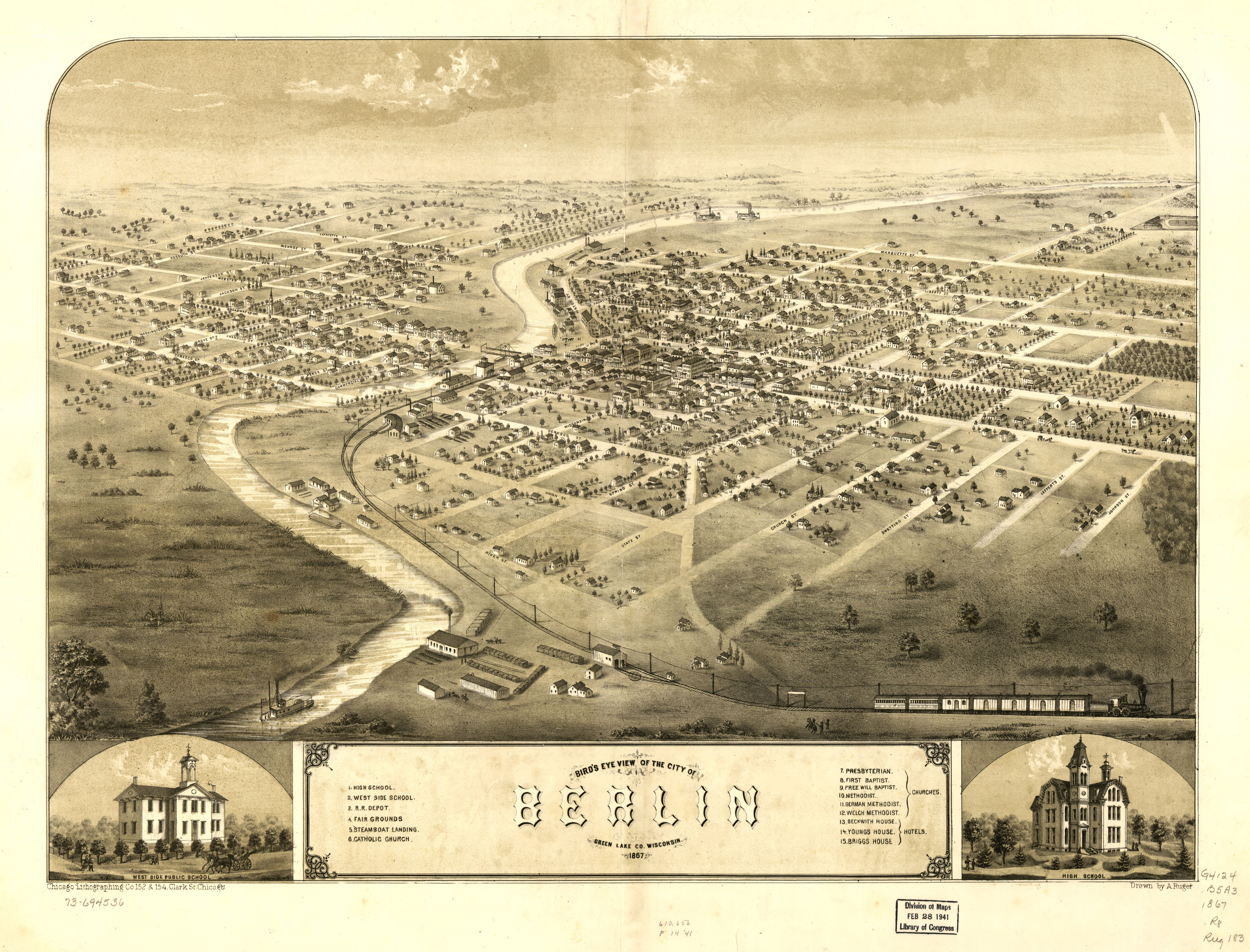
Berlin

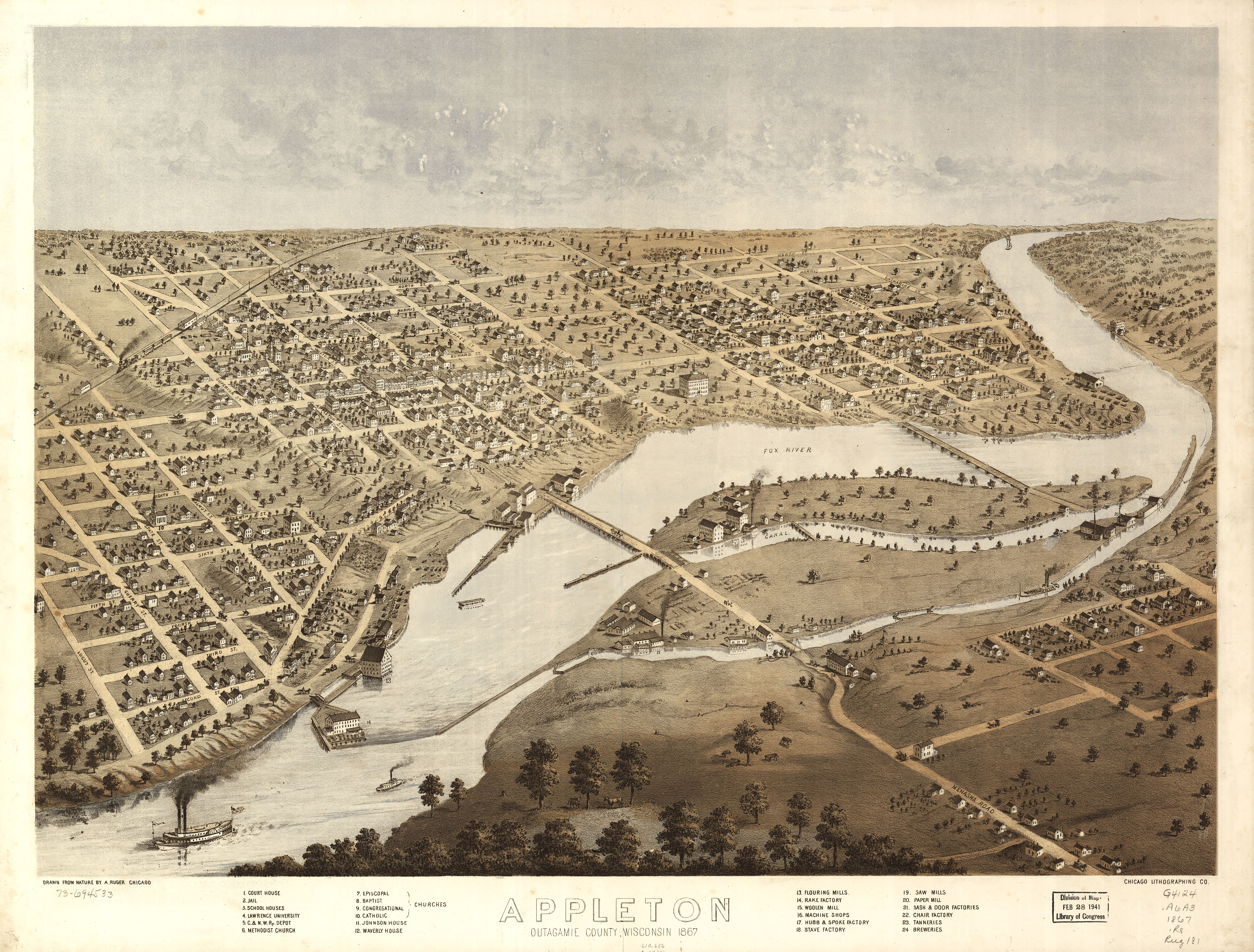
Appleton

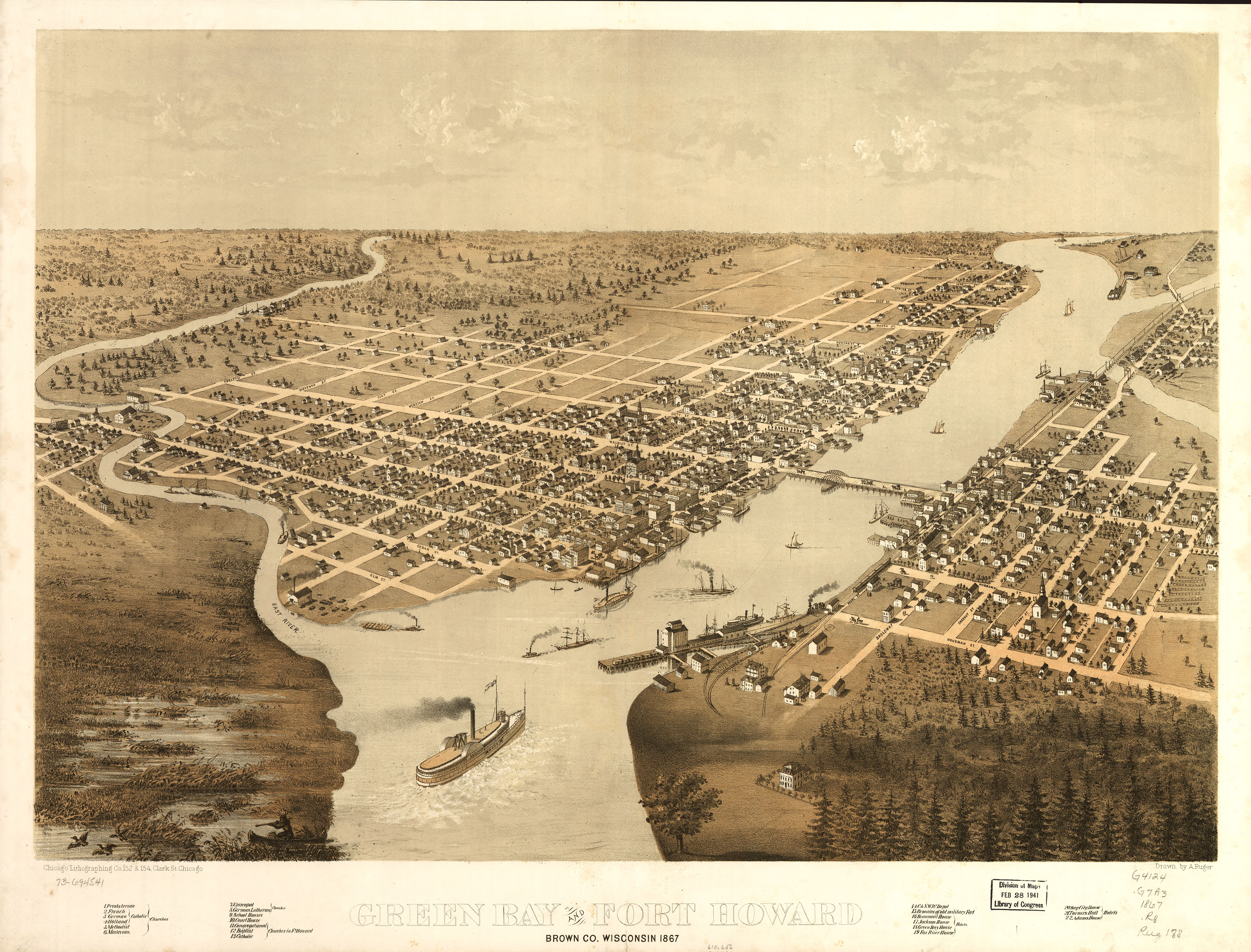
Green Bay

Plan of Fox Wisconsin Waterway from Prairie du Chien on the Mississippi River along the Wisconsin River through the Portage to the Upper Fox.

=== Lower Wisconsin ===
The Wisconsin River is a wide and shallow stream running over a bed of sand with transparent waters and chequered with numerous small islands and sandbars ... The navigation of the river is considerably impeded by the sandbars and small islands and some time is lost is searching for the proper channel.

— Henry Schoolcraft (August 1820)

Along the Lower Wisconsin there were initially no plans for improvements other than dredging and the clearing of snags. This soon proved to be inadequate. In 1868, the Corps began to experiment with wing dams and dredging to sluice out a 6-foot (1.8 m) deep channel. By 1880, the Corps had completed 157 dams totaling over 76,000 feet (23 km), mainly in two sections: between Portage and Prairie du Sac and between Lone Rock and Boscobel. But the wing dams also proved inadequate and steamboats were not willing to risk the passage. In 1887, the Corps recommended to stop this method of improvement, effectively closing the Lower Wisconsin to commercial traffic.

Accordingly, little commercial traffic was ever maintained along this reach of the Waterway.

In 1914 the Prairie du Sac hydroelectric plant was completed creating Lake Wisconsin. This dam marks the lowest of a string of hydroelectric and recreational dams that extend up the Upper Wisconsin almost to its headwaters.

=== The Portage ===
[The Fox] takes its rise in Lake Sarah, Portage county, and runs in a direction a little south of west ... towards the Wisconsin, as if with the intention of entering that river but owing to some unaccountable freak of nature, it here, when within one and a half miles of that stream, makes a sudden turn to the north, and soon assumes its general course towards Green Bay.

— Increase A. Lapham (1844)

Construction initiated along the Portage Canal in 1849 and finished in 1851. In 1856, the first steamship from the Mississippi, the Aquila, passed through the Portage on its way to Green Bay, signaling the opening of the waterway. The lock and canal were improved several times, culminating in the construction of a concrete structure in 1928. There was a guard lock on the Wisconsin (Portage Lock) and a lifting lock to lower boats to the Fox (Fort Winnebago Lock). Each lock was 140 feet (43 m) long and 35 feet (11 m) wide.

Eventually, as in other parts of the Waterway, traffic dropped off and generally included only pleasure craft. By 1900 there was virtually no traffic to the east to Montello. The Wisconsin side of the canal was impacted by floods and sand bars from the Wisconsin. The Canal and Fox River approaches required dredging. In 1959, the Corps closed and dismantled most of the Fort Winnebago Lock to create a waste weir for water-level control. With a limited number of changes, it converted the Portage Lock to a water control structure. In 1961, the ownership of the canal was transferred from the Department of Army to the State Of Wisconsin.

Plan of Fox Wisconsin Waterway from west of the Portage to Green Bay along the Fox River.

=== Upper Fox ===
The Fox River is a very crooked stream, but the scenery along the way is beautiful. We traveled many miles to get through a short space of country.

— Elizabeth Baird (1830)

Along the Upper Fox, only dredging was initially performed. Over time, several dams and locks were added. In the end 7 stone locks, each with about 5 feet (1.6 m) of lift, were constructed at Governor's Bend, Montello, Grand River, Princeton, White River, Berlin and Eureka. Each lock was about 140 feet (43 m) long and 35 feet (11 m) wide.

Dredging was mandatory given the low flow of the Upper Fox. By 1899, dredging had created a 6-foot (1.8 m) deep channel to Berlin, a 4-foot (1.2 m) deep between Berlin and Montello, and a 3-foot (0.9 m) deep channel to the Portage. But the river soon filled with silt when dredging halted.

Initially traffic—primarily steamboats, tugs, and barges carrying primarily lumber, coal, and grain—was sufficient for operations. In 1867 the Corps reported that "[t]he country between Berlin and Portage is almost entirely dependent on the river for transportation". But the impact of railroads was soon felt. Travel and commerce on the Lower Fox declined by the 1880s to a few hundred tons of wheat per month during harvest. By this time most produce could be transported more easily by railroad. Except for a reprise during World War I, by the early 20th century most traffic was pleasure craft.

By 1922 dredging halted, as annual traffic was only about 1000 short tons (1000 metric tons). That same year, the Corps report recommended closing the Upper Fox, but Congress failed to act on the proposal. The Corps finally closed the Upper Fox to navigation between Portage and Eureka in 1951 and transferred it to the state as a recreational waterway. It modified dams to maintain water levels appropriate for wildlife preservation. The federal government quitclaimed its property along the Upper Fox to the State in 1961.

=== Lower Fox ===
We left This bay [Green Bay] to enter the river [Fox] that discharges into it; it is very beautiful at its Mouth ... But, after ascending the river a short distance, it becomes very difficult of passage, on account of both the Currents and the sharp Rocks, which Cut the Canoes and the feet of Those who are obliged to drag them, especially when the Waters are low.

— Father Marquette (1673)

Along the Lower Fox, Martin organized several groups to work on the task of building dams, locks and canals to bypass the numerous falls. The chief technical difficulty was the construction of locks and dams to lift vessels to Lake Winnebago. The dams began at De Pere and continued to Lake Winnebago at Menasha. The greatest concentration of locks was in the reach between Kaukauna to the Cedars, where the Great Kauklin and La Petite Chute falls had to be bypassed.

Landscape painting of The Cedars Lock and Dam in 1856 commissioned by Martin. Drawn by Samuel M. Brookes and Thomas H. Stevenson, they were part of a group paintings of river town sites and locks for the Fox-Wisconsin River Improvement Co. The view is approximately from the present Treaty of the Ceders monument on the north side of river.

Martin began construction in 1830. His promotions for laborers reached Europe and had the direct impact of promoting immigration directly to the area. Irish settlers settled the town of Wrightstown. Dutch settlers founded Little Chute (La Petite Chute) and Holland. By 1850, Martin's company had folded and was taken over by the State of Wisconsin. The Lower Fox locks and dams were completed by 1856, with the completion of the Little Chute and Menasha Locks.

Over time, the dams and locks were improved, combined and updated. In the end 17 locks were constructed, each with about 10 feet (3.0 m) of lift. Each lock was 140 to 150 feet (43–46 m) long and 35 feet (11 m) wide. Dredging was required on many of the short canals and slack-water sections to maintain a 6-foot-deep (1.8 m) deep channel.

Travel and commerce on the Lower Fox proved to be the most profitable of all reaches. Boats carried passengers, mail and a host of products. The total tonnage along the Fox Waterway remained between 150,000 and 300,000 tons through the early 1930s. Local industry along the river, using the power of the various falls, provided a steady market for goods. Regular steamboat travel continued until the 1900.

Even here, however, railroads dominated transportation. Traffic declined sharply. In 1983, the entire system was put into "caretaker" status and the Federal government stopped all maintenance. The state of Wisconsin operated the locks through the 1987 navigation season. After the 1987 navigation season, canals were drained and lock gates were permanently sealed. The lock at Rapide Croche was sealed shut to prevent sea lampreys from reaching Lake Winnebago.

=== Summary ===
In the end, the Fox–Wisconsin Waterway did not become the natural extension of the Erie Canal. There were two technical problems that were not effectively solved for the Waterway: control of the sand bars of the Lower Wisconsin and the low flow of the Upper Fox. Economically, the Waterway failed to compete with the canals in the Chicago area or with the reliability of railroads.

== Current situation ==
Each of the Waterway reaches is being transformed.

=== Lower Wisconsin ===
Downstream of the Prairie du Sac Dam at dam, the Wisconsin is un-dammed for 93 miles (150 km) to its confluence with the Mississippi, one of the longest such stretches in the eastern United States. It is a popular canoe and small craft recreational area. Most of its course is within the Lower Wisconsin State Riverway founded in 1998. The project "seeks to protect and preserve the scenic beauty and natural character of the river valley, seeks to manage the resources of the area for the long-term benefit of the citizens of the state and seeks to provide a quality public recreational area in a manner consistent with the resource and aesthetic protection goals and objectives".

Upstream of the dam, Lake Wisconsin is one of several large lakes popular with boaters and fishermen.

There is little likelihood that commercial traffic will return to this reach in the near future.

=== The Portage ===
Current efforts are to restore the Portage Locks as a historical artifact. The Canal has been placed on the National and State Register of Historic Places through the efforts of the Portage Canal Society, Inc. In 1983, the downtown corridor between Adams Street and the Wisconsin River was restored with City of Portage and Block Grant funds. In 1987, the south bank of the canal became part of the National Ice Age Trail.

There is little likelihood that commercial traffic will return to this reach in the near future.

=== Upper Fox ===
The goal of the Wisconsin DNR is to restore the Upper Fox to a more natural state. All locks except for the most downstream at Eureka have been abandoned or removed. The dam at White River was removed in 2004. Plans are to remove all dams, except for those at Princeton and Montello downstream of Lake Puckaway and Buffalo Lake, respectively. The dam at Eureka has been converted into a fishway to allow spawning fish to migrate upstream, although the locks continue to operate.

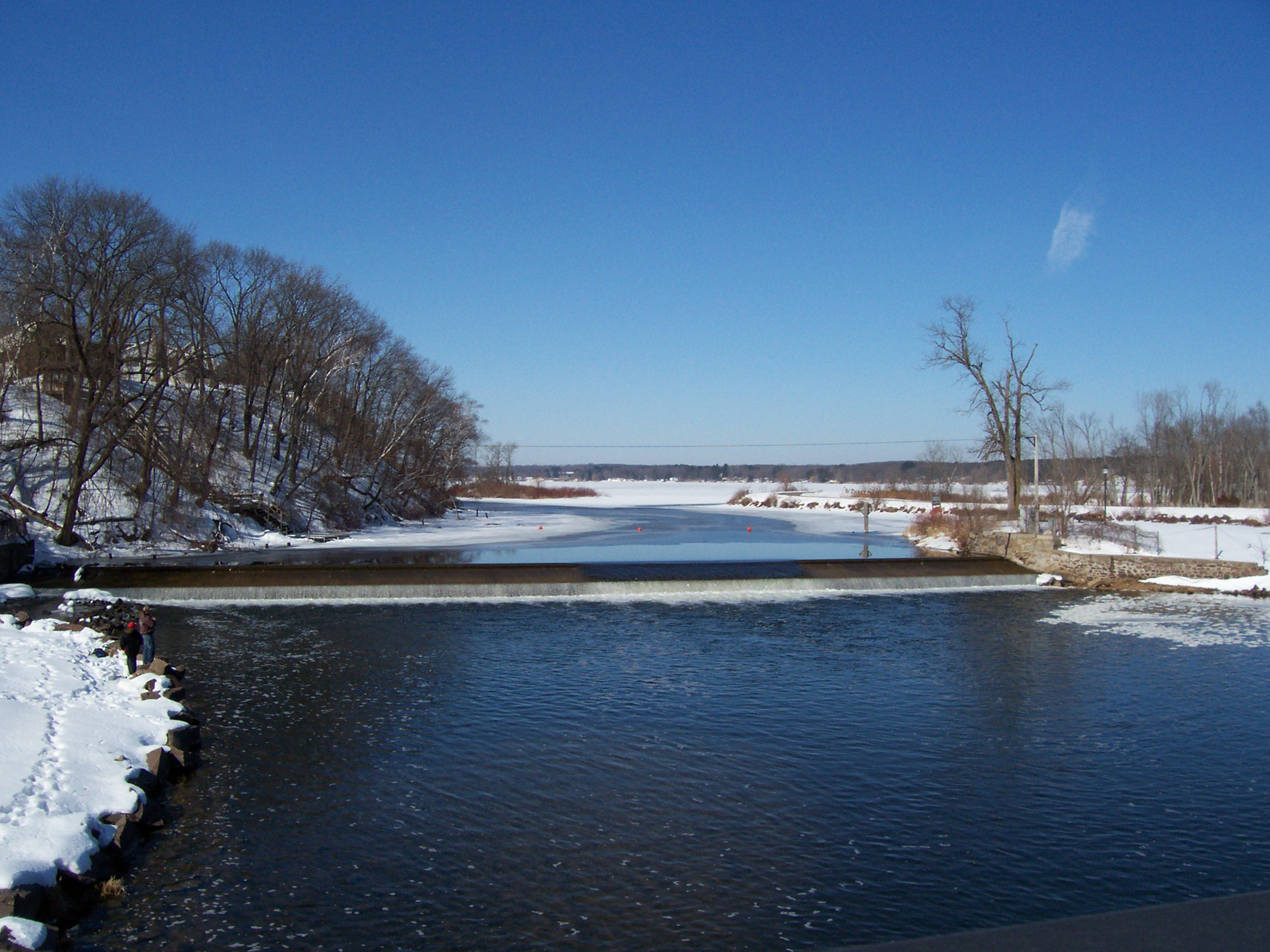
View of Dam at Montello on the Upper Fox River.

There is little likelihood that commercial traffic will return to this reach in the near future.

=== Lower Fox ===
All of the locks along the Lower Fox have been placed on the National and State Register of Historic Places. Since 1983 efforts were made to save the locks from permanent closure. In 2001, the Army Corps of Engineers transferred ownership of the 17 locks that make up the Lower Fox River, Corps Office and property in Kaukauna, and the harbors of Stockbridge and Brothertown on Lake Winnebago to the State of Wisconsin. The Fox River Navigational System Authority was formed and a cost-sharing agreement was created. Funds from the Army Corps of Engineers, the State of Wisconsin, and private donations have combined to rehabilitate, reopen, and maintain the locks. While the locks on the entire Lower Fox (with the exception of Rapide Croche) have been restored and are capable of operation, some remain closed to navigation. The Menasha lock is closed to prevent movement of the round goby, an invasive species, into Lake Winnebago. An electric fish barrier is proposed to allow the lock to reopen. The Kaukauna locks are closed to navigation for 35 years until 2021 when repairs to Veterans Memorial Lift Bridge were completed by City of Kaukauna.

Rapid Croche Lock will remain permanently sealed as a barrier to sea lampreys. A boat lift and transfer station have been proposed to allow navigation through the entire Lower Fox River Navigational System. This transfer station would include measures to cleanse the boats of aquatic invasive species when traveling upstream into the Winnebago Pool.

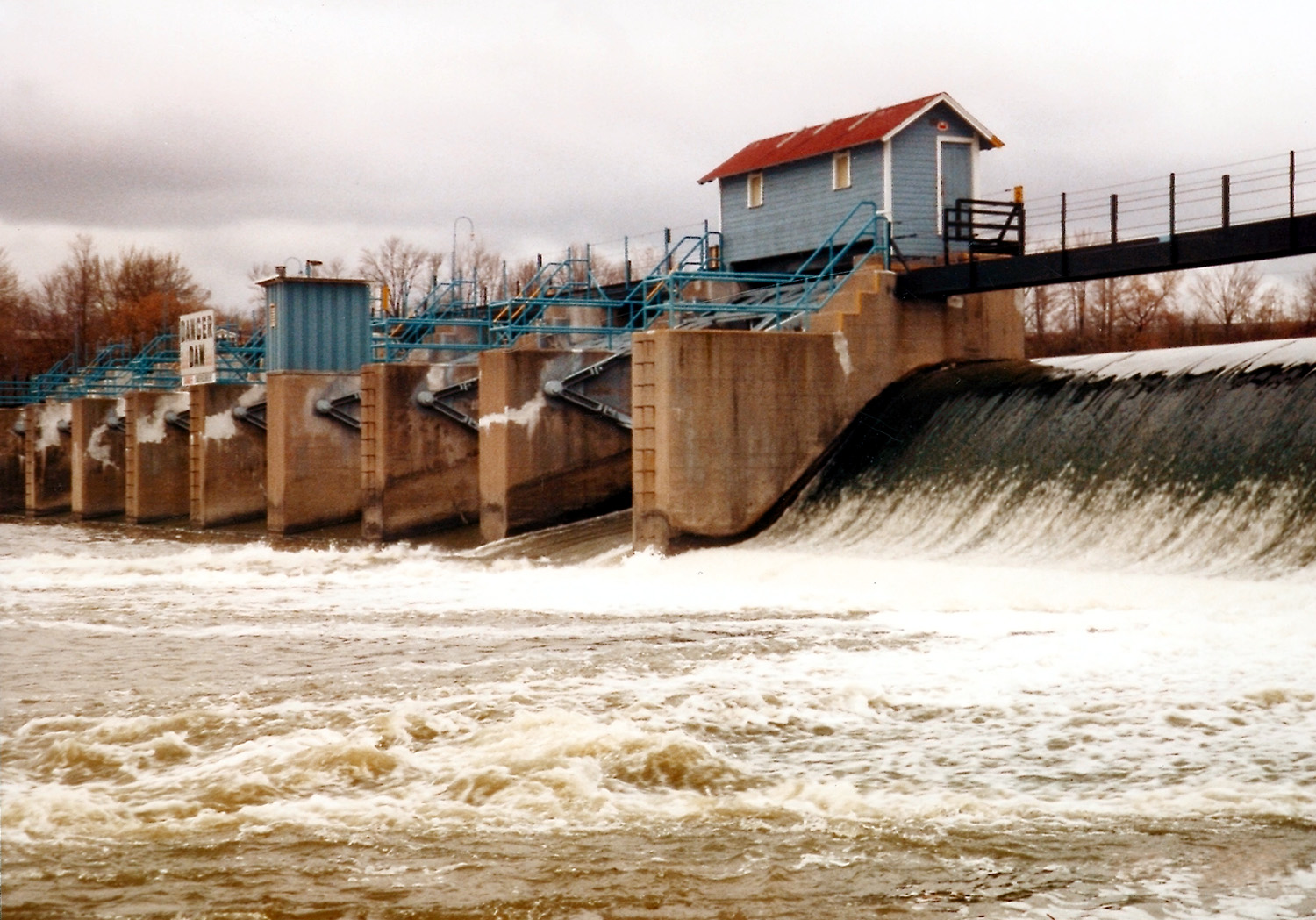
View of a typical dam at the head of the Little Chute Locks and Canal along the Fox River.

There is little likelihood that commercial freight traffic will return to this reach. Recreational boats, and commercial tour boats, use the locks regularly.

== Features ==
The following list of features are provided for the current waterway, from Lake Michigan to the Mississippi River east to west:

Location	Feature	Elevation (lower pool)	Elevation (upper pool)	River distance from Green Bay	River distance from Prairie du Chien	Comment
Green Bay	Green Bay	578 ft (176 m)	578 ft (176 m)	0 mi (0 km)	280 mi (450 km)	
De Pere	Lock	578 ft (176 m)	588 ft (179 m)	7 mi (11 km)	273 mi (439 km)	Operating
Wrightstown	Little Kaukauna Lock & Dam	588 ft (179 m)	592 ft (180 m)	13 mi (21 km)	267 mi (430 km)	Operating
Wrightstown	Rapide Croche Lock & dam	592 ft (180 m)	603 ft (184 m)	20 mi (32 km)	260 mi (420 km)	Permanently closed. Boat lift planned for opening 2017.
Kaukauna	Lock 5	603 ft (184 m)	612 ft (187 m)	24 mi (39 km)	256 mi (412 km)	Upgraded
Kaukauna	Lock 4	612 ft (187 m)	622 ft (190 m)	24 mi (39 km)	256 mi (412 km)	Upgraded
Kaukauna	Lock 3	622 ft (190 m)	632 ft (193 m)	24 mi (39 km)	256 mi (412 km)	Upgraded
Kaukauna	Lock 2	632 ft (193 m)	642 ft (196 m)	24 mi (39 km)	256 mi (412 km)	Upgraded
Kaukauna	Lock 1	642 ft (196 m)	652 ft (199 m)	24 mi (39 km)	256 mi (412 km)	Has guard lock, being upgraded
Combined Locks	Lower Lock	652 ft (199 m)	662 ft (202 m)	26 mi (42 km)	254 mi (409 km)	Upgraded
Combined Locks	Upper Lock	662 ft (202 m)	672 ft (205 m)	26 mi (42 km)	254 mi (409 km)	Upgraded
Little Chute	Lock & Dam	672 ft (205 m)	685 ft (209 m)	27 mi (43 km)	253 mi (407 km)	Has guard lock, being upgraded with completion in 2017.
Kimberly	Cedar Lock & Dam	685 ft (209 m)	695 ft (212 m)	28 mi (45 km)	252 mi (406 km)	Operating
Appleton	Lock 4	695 ft (212 m)	705 ft (215 m)	31 mi (50 km)	249 mi (401 km)	Operating
Appleton	Lock 3	705 ft (215 m)	715 ft (218 m)	32 mi (51 km)	248 mi (399 km)	Operating
Appleton	Lock 2	715 ft (218 m)	725 ft (221 m)	32 mi (51 km)	248 mi (399 km)	Operating
Appleton	Lock 1	725 ft (221 m)	735 ft (224 m)	32 mi (51 km)	248 mi (399 km)	Operating
Appleton	Little Lake Butte des Morts	735 ft (224 m)	735 ft (224 m)	37 mi (60 km)	243 mi (391 km)	Lake
Menasha	Lock	735 ft (224 m)	746 ft (227 m)	37 mi (60 km)	243 mi (391 km)	Operating
Neenah	Lake Winnebago	746 ft (227 m)	746 ft (227 m)	39 mi (63 km)	241 mi (388 km)	Lake
Oshkosh	Big Lake Butte des Morts	746 ft (227 m)	746 ft (227 m)	65 mi (105 km)	215 mi (346 km)	Lake
Butte Des Morts	Wolf River	746 ft (227 m)	746 ft (227 m)	66 mi (106 km)	214 mi (344 km)	Major tributary
Eureka	Fishway and Lock	746 ft (227 m)	750 ft (230 m)	80 mi (130 km)	200 mi (320 km)	Operating
Berlin	Abandoned Dam & Lock	750 ft (230 m)	754 ft (230 m)	90 mi (140 km)	190 mi (310 km)	Slated for removal
White River	Open River	754 ft (230 m)	754 ft (230 m)	96 mi (154 km)	184 mi (296 km)	Removed
Princeton	Dam and Abandoned Lock	754 ft (230 m)	757 ft (231 m)	98 mi (158 km)	182 mi (293 km)	Crest boards
Marquette	Puckaway Lake	763 ft (233 m)	763 ft (233 m)	122 mi (196 km)	158 mi (254 km)	Lake
Grand River	Abandoned Dam & Lock	763 ft (233 m)	764 ft (233 m)	131 mi (211 km)	149 mi (240 km)	Slated for removal
Montello	Dam and Abandoned Lock	764 ft (233 m)	764 ft (233 m)	131 mi (211 km)	149 mi (240 km)	
Endeavor	Buffalo Lake	769 ft (234 m)	769 ft (234 m)	142 mi (229 km)	138 mi (222 km)	Lake
Governor's Bend Park	Abandoned Dam & Lock	769 ft (234 m)	774 ft (236 m)	147 mi (237 km)	133 mi (214 km)	Slated for removal
Portage	Portage Canal	780.0 ft (237.7 m)	780 ft (240 m)	162 mi (261 km)	118 mi (190 km)	Closed
Portage	Lock at Wis River	780 ft (240 m)	782 ft (238 m)	165 mi (266 km)	115 mi (185 km)	Closed
Prairie du Sac	Lake Wisconsin	774 ft (236 m)	774 ft (236 m)	176 mi (283 km)	104 mi (167 km)	
Merrimac	Ferry	774 ft (236 m)	774 ft (236 m)	180 mi (290 km)	101 mi (163 km)	
Prairie du Sac	Dam	735 ft (224 m)	774 ft (236 m)	188 mi (303 km)	92 mi (148 km)	Locks unusable
Prairie du Chien	Mississippi River	611 ft (186 m)	611 ft (186 m)	280 mi (450 km)	0 mi (0 km)	Mississippi River Mile 631
