= Indian Lake (Wisconsin) =

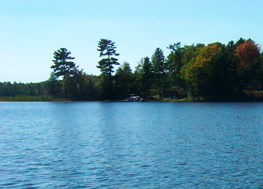
- Indian Lake

- Location within Wisconsin
- Location: Oneida County, Wisconsin
- Coordinates: 45.8140228°N 89.3016180°W
- Type: lake

Indian Lake is a freshwater lake located in Sugar Camp, Oneida County, Wisconsin, United States.

In 1950, the Wisconsin state record smallmouth bass was caught in Indian Lake. It weighed 9 pounds 1 ounce (4.1 kg).
