= Gile Flowage =

- Location within Wisconsin Location within the United States
- Location: Iron County, Wisconsin
- Coordinates: 46°23′38″N 90°13′52″W
- Type: Lake
- Basin countries: United States
- Surface area: 3,138 acres (1,270 ha)
- Max. depth: 25 ft (7.6 m)

Gile Flowage is a lake in the U.S. state of Wisconsin, located south of the city of Montreal.

In 1967, the Wisconsin state record Black crappie was caught in the Gile Flowage. It was 19.75 inches (50.2 cm) long and weighed 4 pounds 8 ounces (2.0 kg).

Fishing is regulated by the Wisconsin DNR.

== See also ==
- List of lakes in Wisconsin
