= Columbia Lake (Wisconsin) =

Lake in Columbia County, Wisconsin, US

- Location within Wisconsin Location within the United States
- Location: Columbia County, Wisconsin
- Coordinates: 43.4749837°N 89.4195635°W
- Basin countries: United States
- Surface area: 378 acres (153 ha)
- Max. depth: 8 feet (2.4 m)
- Surface elevation: 791 feet (241 m)

Columbia Lake is a lake near Portage in Columbia County, Wisconsin, United States. It is fed by the Wisconsin River and receives heat from a nearby power plant cooling pipe. As a result, the portion of the lake to the east of a dividing bank of earth is 62 °F or circa 15 °C in the winter, with a dense cover of fog in colder weather. This temperature prevents many types of lake weeds from growing. The lake is stocked with various types of fish and contains an uncommon hybrid bass. Four pacus, a South American fish similar to the piranha, which were thrown into the lake survived until they were caught and removed from the lake.
